

191001–191100 

|-bgcolor=#fefefe
| 191001 ||  || — || December 18, 2001 || Socorro || LINEAR || NYS || align=right | 1.4 km || 
|-id=002 bgcolor=#fefefe
| 191002 ||  || — || December 18, 2001 || Socorro || LINEAR || V || align=right | 1.5 km || 
|-id=003 bgcolor=#E9E9E9
| 191003 ||  || — || December 18, 2001 || Socorro || LINEAR || — || align=right | 2.2 km || 
|-id=004 bgcolor=#fefefe
| 191004 ||  || — || December 18, 2001 || Socorro || LINEAR || — || align=right | 3.6 km || 
|-id=005 bgcolor=#fefefe
| 191005 ||  || — || December 18, 2001 || Palomar || NEAT || — || align=right | 1.9 km || 
|-id=006 bgcolor=#fefefe
| 191006 ||  || — || December 18, 2001 || Socorro || LINEAR || — || align=right | 1.5 km || 
|-id=007 bgcolor=#fefefe
| 191007 ||  || — || December 19, 2001 || Socorro || LINEAR || — || align=right | 1.4 km || 
|-id=008 bgcolor=#fefefe
| 191008 ||  || — || December 17, 2001 || Socorro || LINEAR || — || align=right | 1.8 km || 
|-id=009 bgcolor=#fefefe
| 191009 ||  || — || December 20, 2001 || Socorro || LINEAR || V || align=right | 1.2 km || 
|-id=010 bgcolor=#E9E9E9
| 191010 ||  || — || January 5, 2002 || Haleakala || NEAT || — || align=right | 1.6 km || 
|-id=011 bgcolor=#fefefe
| 191011 ||  || — || January 6, 2002 || Socorro || LINEAR || — || align=right | 2.1 km || 
|-id=012 bgcolor=#fefefe
| 191012 ||  || — || January 8, 2002 || Socorro || LINEAR || — || align=right | 1.5 km || 
|-id=013 bgcolor=#fefefe
| 191013 ||  || — || January 9, 2002 || Socorro || LINEAR || — || align=right | 1.4 km || 
|-id=014 bgcolor=#E9E9E9
| 191014 ||  || — || January 9, 2002 || Socorro || LINEAR || — || align=right | 1.3 km || 
|-id=015 bgcolor=#E9E9E9
| 191015 ||  || — || January 9, 2002 || Socorro || LINEAR || — || align=right | 1.2 km || 
|-id=016 bgcolor=#E9E9E9
| 191016 ||  || — || January 11, 2002 || Socorro || LINEAR || — || align=right | 3.6 km || 
|-id=017 bgcolor=#E9E9E9
| 191017 ||  || — || January 8, 2002 || Socorro || LINEAR || — || align=right | 1.5 km || 
|-id=018 bgcolor=#fefefe
| 191018 ||  || — || January 9, 2002 || Socorro || LINEAR || — || align=right | 1.7 km || 
|-id=019 bgcolor=#E9E9E9
| 191019 ||  || — || January 11, 2002 || Socorro || LINEAR || — || align=right | 2.2 km || 
|-id=020 bgcolor=#fefefe
| 191020 ||  || — || January 8, 2002 || Socorro || LINEAR || MAS || align=right data-sort-value="0.92" | 920 m || 
|-id=021 bgcolor=#E9E9E9
| 191021 ||  || — || January 9, 2002 || Socorro || LINEAR || — || align=right | 1.4 km || 
|-id=022 bgcolor=#E9E9E9
| 191022 ||  || — || January 9, 2002 || Socorro || LINEAR || — || align=right | 2.1 km || 
|-id=023 bgcolor=#fefefe
| 191023 ||  || — || January 9, 2002 || Socorro || LINEAR || MAS || align=right | 1.4 km || 
|-id=024 bgcolor=#E9E9E9
| 191024 ||  || — || January 9, 2002 || Socorro || LINEAR || MAR || align=right | 1.6 km || 
|-id=025 bgcolor=#fefefe
| 191025 ||  || — || January 14, 2002 || Socorro || LINEAR || — || align=right | 1.5 km || 
|-id=026 bgcolor=#fefefe
| 191026 ||  || — || January 13, 2002 || Socorro || LINEAR || NYS || align=right data-sort-value="0.96" | 960 m || 
|-id=027 bgcolor=#E9E9E9
| 191027 ||  || — || January 13, 2002 || Socorro || LINEAR || — || align=right | 1.9 km || 
|-id=028 bgcolor=#C2FFFF
| 191028 ||  || — || January 14, 2002 || Socorro || LINEAR || L4HEK || align=right | 17 km || 
|-id=029 bgcolor=#E9E9E9
| 191029 || 2002 BR || — || January 21, 2002 || Desert Eagle || W. K. Y. Yeung || — || align=right | 2.0 km || 
|-id=030 bgcolor=#fefefe
| 191030 ||  || — || January 21, 2002 || Socorro || LINEAR || H || align=right data-sort-value="0.89" | 890 m || 
|-id=031 bgcolor=#E9E9E9
| 191031 ||  || — || January 19, 2002 || Socorro || LINEAR || — || align=right | 3.0 km || 
|-id=032 bgcolor=#fefefe
| 191032 ||  || — || January 19, 2002 || Socorro || LINEAR || H || align=right data-sort-value="0.96" | 960 m || 
|-id=033 bgcolor=#E9E9E9
| 191033 ||  || — || January 19, 2002 || Socorro || LINEAR || — || align=right | 1.8 km || 
|-id=034 bgcolor=#E9E9E9
| 191034 ||  || — || January 18, 2002 || Anderson Mesa || LONEOS || MAR || align=right | 1.6 km || 
|-id=035 bgcolor=#FA8072
| 191035 ||  || — || February 6, 2002 || Socorro || LINEAR || PHO || align=right | 1.7 km || 
|-id=036 bgcolor=#E9E9E9
| 191036 ||  || — || February 4, 2002 || Palomar || NEAT || VIB || align=right | 5.0 km || 
|-id=037 bgcolor=#fefefe
| 191037 ||  || — || February 4, 2002 || Palomar || NEAT || — || align=right | 1.5 km || 
|-id=038 bgcolor=#E9E9E9
| 191038 ||  || — || February 4, 2002 || Haleakala || NEAT || EUN || align=right | 1.9 km || 
|-id=039 bgcolor=#E9E9E9
| 191039 ||  || — || February 6, 2002 || Haleakala || NEAT || EUN || align=right | 2.4 km || 
|-id=040 bgcolor=#fefefe
| 191040 ||  || — || February 10, 2002 || Socorro || LINEAR || H || align=right | 1.1 km || 
|-id=041 bgcolor=#E9E9E9
| 191041 ||  || — || February 6, 2002 || Socorro || LINEAR || RAF || align=right | 2.1 km || 
|-id=042 bgcolor=#fefefe
| 191042 ||  || — || February 6, 2002 || Socorro || LINEAR || V || align=right | 1.5 km || 
|-id=043 bgcolor=#E9E9E9
| 191043 ||  || — || February 6, 2002 || Socorro || LINEAR || — || align=right | 3.7 km || 
|-id=044 bgcolor=#E9E9E9
| 191044 ||  || — || February 6, 2002 || Socorro || LINEAR || MAR || align=right | 2.0 km || 
|-id=045 bgcolor=#E9E9E9
| 191045 ||  || — || February 6, 2002 || Socorro || LINEAR || — || align=right | 1.9 km || 
|-id=046 bgcolor=#E9E9E9
| 191046 ||  || — || February 11, 2002 || Desert Eagle || W. K. Y. Yeung || — || align=right | 2.0 km || 
|-id=047 bgcolor=#E9E9E9
| 191047 ||  || — || February 7, 2002 || Haleakala || NEAT || — || align=right | 4.4 km || 
|-id=048 bgcolor=#E9E9E9
| 191048 ||  || — || February 7, 2002 || Socorro || LINEAR || — || align=right | 4.0 km || 
|-id=049 bgcolor=#E9E9E9
| 191049 ||  || — || February 7, 2002 || Socorro || LINEAR || — || align=right | 4.7 km || 
|-id=050 bgcolor=#E9E9E9
| 191050 ||  || — || February 6, 2002 || Socorro || LINEAR || MAR || align=right | 1.8 km || 
|-id=051 bgcolor=#E9E9E9
| 191051 ||  || — || February 6, 2002 || Socorro || LINEAR || — || align=right | 4.2 km || 
|-id=052 bgcolor=#E9E9E9
| 191052 ||  || — || February 7, 2002 || Socorro || LINEAR || — || align=right | 1.9 km || 
|-id=053 bgcolor=#E9E9E9
| 191053 ||  || — || February 7, 2002 || Socorro || LINEAR || INO || align=right | 2.5 km || 
|-id=054 bgcolor=#C2FFFF
| 191054 ||  || — || February 7, 2002 || Socorro || LINEAR || L4 || align=right | 17 km || 
|-id=055 bgcolor=#E9E9E9
| 191055 ||  || — || February 7, 2002 || Socorro || LINEAR || — || align=right | 2.6 km || 
|-id=056 bgcolor=#E9E9E9
| 191056 ||  || — || February 7, 2002 || Socorro || LINEAR || — || align=right | 4.7 km || 
|-id=057 bgcolor=#E9E9E9
| 191057 ||  || — || February 7, 2002 || Socorro || LINEAR || — || align=right | 2.8 km || 
|-id=058 bgcolor=#E9E9E9
| 191058 ||  || — || February 7, 2002 || Socorro || LINEAR || — || align=right | 1.8 km || 
|-id=059 bgcolor=#FA8072
| 191059 ||  || — || February 7, 2002 || Socorro || LINEAR || H || align=right | 1.3 km || 
|-id=060 bgcolor=#C2FFFF
| 191060 ||  || — || February 7, 2002 || Socorro || LINEAR || L4 || align=right | 16 km || 
|-id=061 bgcolor=#E9E9E9
| 191061 ||  || — || February 7, 2002 || Kitt Peak || Spacewatch || — || align=right | 1.1 km || 
|-id=062 bgcolor=#E9E9E9
| 191062 ||  || — || February 7, 2002 || Socorro || LINEAR || — || align=right | 1.5 km || 
|-id=063 bgcolor=#E9E9E9
| 191063 ||  || — || February 8, 2002 || Socorro || LINEAR || ADE || align=right | 4.3 km || 
|-id=064 bgcolor=#E9E9E9
| 191064 ||  || — || February 8, 2002 || Socorro || LINEAR || HNS || align=right | 2.4 km || 
|-id=065 bgcolor=#fefefe
| 191065 ||  || — || February 8, 2002 || Socorro || LINEAR || — || align=right | 2.6 km || 
|-id=066 bgcolor=#fefefe
| 191066 ||  || — || February 9, 2002 || Socorro || LINEAR || NYS || align=right | 1.0 km || 
|-id=067 bgcolor=#E9E9E9
| 191067 ||  || — || February 10, 2002 || Socorro || LINEAR || — || align=right | 1.3 km || 
|-id=068 bgcolor=#C2FFFF
| 191068 ||  || — || February 10, 2002 || Socorro || LINEAR || L4 || align=right | 14 km || 
|-id=069 bgcolor=#E9E9E9
| 191069 ||  || — || February 10, 2002 || Socorro || LINEAR || — || align=right | 1.5 km || 
|-id=070 bgcolor=#E9E9E9
| 191070 ||  || — || February 10, 2002 || Socorro || LINEAR || — || align=right | 1.3 km || 
|-id=071 bgcolor=#E9E9E9
| 191071 ||  || — || February 6, 2002 || Socorro || LINEAR || — || align=right | 2.6 km || 
|-id=072 bgcolor=#E9E9E9
| 191072 ||  || — || February 10, 2002 || Socorro || LINEAR || — || align=right | 1.2 km || 
|-id=073 bgcolor=#E9E9E9
| 191073 ||  || — || February 10, 2002 || Socorro || LINEAR || — || align=right | 1.4 km || 
|-id=074 bgcolor=#E9E9E9
| 191074 ||  || — || February 10, 2002 || Socorro || LINEAR || — || align=right | 3.8 km || 
|-id=075 bgcolor=#C2FFFF
| 191075 ||  || — || February 10, 2002 || Socorro || LINEAR || L4 || align=right | 17 km || 
|-id=076 bgcolor=#E9E9E9
| 191076 ||  || — || February 10, 2002 || Socorro || LINEAR || — || align=right | 2.4 km || 
|-id=077 bgcolor=#E9E9E9
| 191077 ||  || — || February 10, 2002 || Socorro || LINEAR || — || align=right | 3.1 km || 
|-id=078 bgcolor=#C2FFFF
| 191078 ||  || — || February 10, 2002 || Socorro || LINEAR || L4 || align=right | 15 km || 
|-id=079 bgcolor=#E9E9E9
| 191079 ||  || — || February 10, 2002 || Socorro || LINEAR || — || align=right | 1.5 km || 
|-id=080 bgcolor=#E9E9E9
| 191080 ||  || — || February 6, 2002 || Palomar || NEAT || — || align=right | 3.1 km || 
|-id=081 bgcolor=#E9E9E9
| 191081 ||  || — || February 6, 2002 || Socorro || LINEAR || — || align=right | 2.0 km || 
|-id=082 bgcolor=#E9E9E9
| 191082 ||  || — || February 13, 2002 || Kitt Peak || Spacewatch || — || align=right | 1.6 km || 
|-id=083 bgcolor=#E9E9E9
| 191083 ||  || — || February 14, 2002 || Haleakala || NEAT || — || align=right | 2.0 km || 
|-id=084 bgcolor=#E9E9E9
| 191084 ||  || — || February 14, 2002 || Kitt Peak || Spacewatch || HEN || align=right | 1.4 km || 
|-id=085 bgcolor=#E9E9E9
| 191085 ||  || — || February 8, 2002 || Kitt Peak || Spacewatch || — || align=right | 3.2 km || 
|-id=086 bgcolor=#E9E9E9
| 191086 ||  || — || February 7, 2002 || Palomar || NEAT || — || align=right | 1.7 km || 
|-id=087 bgcolor=#E9E9E9
| 191087 ||  || — || February 8, 2002 || Kitt Peak || Spacewatch || — || align=right | 2.4 km || 
|-id=088 bgcolor=#C2FFFF
| 191088 ||  || — || February 10, 2002 || Socorro || LINEAR || L4ERY || align=right | 13 km || 
|-id=089 bgcolor=#C2FFFF
| 191089 ||  || — || February 10, 2002 || Socorro || LINEAR || L4 || align=right | 17 km || 
|-id=090 bgcolor=#E9E9E9
| 191090 ||  || — || February 12, 2002 || Socorro || LINEAR || — || align=right | 3.8 km || 
|-id=091 bgcolor=#E9E9E9
| 191091 ||  || — || February 13, 2002 || Palomar || NEAT || — || align=right | 1.4 km || 
|-id=092 bgcolor=#E9E9E9
| 191092 ||  || — || February 11, 2002 || Socorro || LINEAR || — || align=right | 2.8 km || 
|-id=093 bgcolor=#E9E9E9
| 191093 || 2002 EF || — || March 3, 2002 || Gnosca || S. Sposetti || — || align=right | 3.2 km || 
|-id=094 bgcolor=#FFC2E0
| 191094 ||  || — || March 9, 2002 || Socorro || LINEAR || APOcritical || align=right data-sort-value="0.34" | 340 m || 
|-id=095 bgcolor=#fefefe
| 191095 ||  || — || March 9, 2002 || Socorro || LINEAR || H || align=right data-sort-value="0.94" | 940 m || 
|-id=096 bgcolor=#E9E9E9
| 191096 ||  || — || March 6, 2002 || Siding Spring || R. H. McNaught || — || align=right | 2.6 km || 
|-id=097 bgcolor=#E9E9E9
| 191097 ||  || — || March 14, 2002 || Palomar || NEAT || HNS || align=right | 2.4 km || 
|-id=098 bgcolor=#fefefe
| 191098 ||  || — || March 13, 2002 || Palomar || NEAT || H || align=right | 1.1 km || 
|-id=099 bgcolor=#fefefe
| 191099 ||  || — || March 14, 2002 || Socorro || LINEAR || H || align=right | 1.2 km || 
|-id=100 bgcolor=#fefefe
| 191100 ||  || — || March 5, 2002 || Haleakala || NEAT || H || align=right data-sort-value="0.95" | 950 m || 
|}

191101–191200 

|-bgcolor=#E9E9E9
| 191101 ||  || — || March 6, 2002 || Palomar || NEAT || MAR || align=right | 2.7 km || 
|-id=102 bgcolor=#C2FFFF
| 191102 ||  || — || March 5, 2002 || Kitt Peak || Spacewatch || L4 || align=right | 15 km || 
|-id=103 bgcolor=#C2FFFF
| 191103 ||  || — || March 12, 2002 || Socorro || LINEAR || L4 || align=right | 13 km || 
|-id=104 bgcolor=#C2FFFF
| 191104 ||  || — || March 10, 2002 || Haleakala || NEAT || L4 || align=right | 14 km || 
|-id=105 bgcolor=#E9E9E9
| 191105 ||  || — || March 12, 2002 || Palomar || NEAT || — || align=right | 2.2 km || 
|-id=106 bgcolor=#E9E9E9
| 191106 ||  || — || March 13, 2002 || Socorro || LINEAR || — || align=right | 3.7 km || 
|-id=107 bgcolor=#C2FFFF
| 191107 ||  || — || March 13, 2002 || Socorro || LINEAR || L4 || align=right | 15 km || 
|-id=108 bgcolor=#C2FFFF
| 191108 ||  || — || March 13, 2002 || Socorro || LINEAR || L4 || align=right | 14 km || 
|-id=109 bgcolor=#E9E9E9
| 191109 ||  || — || March 13, 2002 || Socorro || LINEAR || — || align=right | 2.3 km || 
|-id=110 bgcolor=#E9E9E9
| 191110 ||  || — || March 13, 2002 || Socorro || LINEAR || — || align=right | 2.3 km || 
|-id=111 bgcolor=#E9E9E9
| 191111 ||  || — || March 13, 2002 || Socorro || LINEAR || PAD || align=right | 3.5 km || 
|-id=112 bgcolor=#E9E9E9
| 191112 ||  || — || March 13, 2002 || Socorro || LINEAR || — || align=right | 4.1 km || 
|-id=113 bgcolor=#d6d6d6
| 191113 ||  || — || March 13, 2002 || Socorro || LINEAR || BRA || align=right | 2.4 km || 
|-id=114 bgcolor=#C2FFFF
| 191114 ||  || — || March 13, 2002 || Palomar || NEAT || L4 || align=right | 18 km || 
|-id=115 bgcolor=#C2FFFF
| 191115 ||  || — || March 9, 2002 || Socorro || LINEAR || L4 || align=right | 20 km || 
|-id=116 bgcolor=#C2FFFF
| 191116 ||  || — || March 9, 2002 || Socorro || LINEAR || L4ERY || align=right | 13 km || 
|-id=117 bgcolor=#E9E9E9
| 191117 ||  || — || March 12, 2002 || Socorro || LINEAR || NEM || align=right | 4.0 km || 
|-id=118 bgcolor=#d6d6d6
| 191118 ||  || — || March 14, 2002 || Socorro || LINEAR || THM || align=right | 3.6 km || 
|-id=119 bgcolor=#E9E9E9
| 191119 ||  || — || March 14, 2002 || Socorro || LINEAR || — || align=right | 3.0 km || 
|-id=120 bgcolor=#E9E9E9
| 191120 ||  || — || March 12, 2002 || Palomar || NEAT || — || align=right | 3.2 km || 
|-id=121 bgcolor=#E9E9E9
| 191121 ||  || — || March 13, 2002 || Socorro || LINEAR || NEM || align=right | 3.5 km || 
|-id=122 bgcolor=#E9E9E9
| 191122 ||  || — || March 13, 2002 || Kitt Peak || Spacewatch || NEM || align=right | 3.2 km || 
|-id=123 bgcolor=#E9E9E9
| 191123 ||  || — || March 13, 2002 || Palomar || NEAT || — || align=right | 2.0 km || 
|-id=124 bgcolor=#E9E9E9
| 191124 ||  || — || March 12, 2002 || Palomar || NEAT || HEN || align=right | 1.8 km || 
|-id=125 bgcolor=#E9E9E9
| 191125 ||  || — || March 12, 2002 || Palomar || NEAT || — || align=right | 2.0 km || 
|-id=126 bgcolor=#E9E9E9
| 191126 ||  || — || March 12, 2002 || Palomar || NEAT || PAD || align=right | 2.9 km || 
|-id=127 bgcolor=#E9E9E9
| 191127 ||  || — || March 18, 2002 || Desert Eagle || W. K. Y. Yeung || — || align=right | 4.0 km || 
|-id=128 bgcolor=#E9E9E9
| 191128 ||  || — || March 19, 2002 || Desert Eagle || W. K. Y. Yeung || — || align=right | 3.1 km || 
|-id=129 bgcolor=#E9E9E9
| 191129 ||  || — || March 17, 2002 || Socorro || LINEAR || — || align=right | 2.8 km || 
|-id=130 bgcolor=#d6d6d6
| 191130 ||  || — || March 20, 2002 || Socorro || LINEAR || — || align=right | 5.2 km || 
|-id=131 bgcolor=#fefefe
| 191131 ||  || — || April 10, 2002 || Socorro || LINEAR || H || align=right data-sort-value="0.97" | 970 m || 
|-id=132 bgcolor=#E9E9E9
| 191132 ||  || — || April 15, 2002 || Palomar || NEAT || MIS || align=right | 3.8 km || 
|-id=133 bgcolor=#E9E9E9
| 191133 ||  || — || April 1, 2002 || Anderson Mesa || LONEOS || — || align=right | 2.8 km || 
|-id=134 bgcolor=#E9E9E9
| 191134 ||  || — || April 1, 2002 || Anderson Mesa || LONEOS || EUN || align=right | 1.7 km || 
|-id=135 bgcolor=#E9E9E9
| 191135 ||  || — || April 4, 2002 || Palomar || NEAT || — || align=right | 2.4 km || 
|-id=136 bgcolor=#E9E9E9
| 191136 ||  || — || April 4, 2002 || Palomar || NEAT || — || align=right | 2.8 km || 
|-id=137 bgcolor=#E9E9E9
| 191137 ||  || — || April 5, 2002 || Palomar || NEAT || — || align=right | 4.8 km || 
|-id=138 bgcolor=#d6d6d6
| 191138 ||  || — || April 8, 2002 || Bergisch Gladbach || W. Bickel || — || align=right | 4.5 km || 
|-id=139 bgcolor=#E9E9E9
| 191139 ||  || — || April 9, 2002 || Kitt Peak || Spacewatch || — || align=right | 2.1 km || 
|-id=140 bgcolor=#E9E9E9
| 191140 ||  || — || April 10, 2002 || Socorro || LINEAR || — || align=right | 3.1 km || 
|-id=141 bgcolor=#d6d6d6
| 191141 ||  || — || April 10, 2002 || Socorro || LINEAR || — || align=right | 4.4 km || 
|-id=142 bgcolor=#E9E9E9
| 191142 ||  || — || April 10, 2002 || Socorro || LINEAR || — || align=right | 3.7 km || 
|-id=143 bgcolor=#E9E9E9
| 191143 ||  || — || April 10, 2002 || Socorro || LINEAR || WIT || align=right | 2.1 km || 
|-id=144 bgcolor=#E9E9E9
| 191144 ||  || — || April 11, 2002 || Anderson Mesa || LONEOS || — || align=right | 3.7 km || 
|-id=145 bgcolor=#E9E9E9
| 191145 ||  || — || April 12, 2002 || Palomar || NEAT || ADE || align=right | 2.0 km || 
|-id=146 bgcolor=#E9E9E9
| 191146 ||  || — || April 12, 2002 || Socorro || LINEAR || — || align=right | 3.4 km || 
|-id=147 bgcolor=#fefefe
| 191147 ||  || — || April 12, 2002 || Socorro || LINEAR || — || align=right | 1.4 km || 
|-id=148 bgcolor=#E9E9E9
| 191148 ||  || — || April 13, 2002 || Palomar || NEAT || GER || align=right | 5.1 km || 
|-id=149 bgcolor=#E9E9E9
| 191149 ||  || — || April 14, 2002 || Socorro || LINEAR || HOF || align=right | 4.3 km || 
|-id=150 bgcolor=#E9E9E9
| 191150 ||  || — || April 14, 2002 || Palomar || NEAT || — || align=right | 3.1 km || 
|-id=151 bgcolor=#E9E9E9
| 191151 ||  || — || April 10, 2002 || Socorro || LINEAR || — || align=right | 3.8 km || 
|-id=152 bgcolor=#E9E9E9
| 191152 ||  || — || April 16, 2002 || Socorro || LINEAR || — || align=right | 2.7 km || 
|-id=153 bgcolor=#fefefe
| 191153 ||  || — || April 17, 2002 || Socorro || LINEAR || H || align=right data-sort-value="0.99" | 990 m || 
|-id=154 bgcolor=#E9E9E9
| 191154 ||  || — || April 18, 2002 || Haleakala || NEAT || — || align=right | 4.7 km || 
|-id=155 bgcolor=#d6d6d6
| 191155 ||  || — || May 4, 2002 || Anderson Mesa || LONEOS || — || align=right | 5.5 km || 
|-id=156 bgcolor=#E9E9E9
| 191156 ||  || — || May 9, 2002 || Palomar || NEAT || WAT || align=right | 3.5 km || 
|-id=157 bgcolor=#E9E9E9
| 191157 ||  || — || May 9, 2002 || Palomar || NEAT || — || align=right | 1.8 km || 
|-id=158 bgcolor=#fefefe
| 191158 ||  || — || May 9, 2002 || Socorro || LINEAR || H || align=right | 1.3 km || 
|-id=159 bgcolor=#d6d6d6
| 191159 ||  || — || May 8, 2002 || Socorro || LINEAR || — || align=right | 5.0 km || 
|-id=160 bgcolor=#d6d6d6
| 191160 ||  || — || May 8, 2002 || Socorro || LINEAR || — || align=right | 5.6 km || 
|-id=161 bgcolor=#d6d6d6
| 191161 ||  || — || May 11, 2002 || Socorro || LINEAR || — || align=right | 3.5 km || 
|-id=162 bgcolor=#d6d6d6
| 191162 ||  || — || May 6, 2002 || Socorro || LINEAR || — || align=right | 10 km || 
|-id=163 bgcolor=#E9E9E9
| 191163 ||  || — || May 7, 2002 || Palomar || NEAT || — || align=right | 3.3 km || 
|-id=164 bgcolor=#d6d6d6
| 191164 ||  || — || May 8, 2002 || Anderson Mesa || LONEOS || — || align=right | 3.5 km || 
|-id=165 bgcolor=#E9E9E9
| 191165 ||  || — || May 9, 2002 || Palomar || NEAT || — || align=right | 3.1 km || 
|-id=166 bgcolor=#E9E9E9
| 191166 ||  || — || May 18, 2002 || Palomar || NEAT || NEM || align=right | 4.1 km || 
|-id=167 bgcolor=#d6d6d6
| 191167 ||  || — || June 1, 2002 || Socorro || LINEAR || — || align=right | 5.1 km || 
|-id=168 bgcolor=#d6d6d6
| 191168 ||  || — || June 9, 2002 || Haleakala || NEAT || — || align=right | 5.8 km || 
|-id=169 bgcolor=#d6d6d6
| 191169 ||  || — || June 9, 2002 || Socorro || LINEAR || — || align=right | 7.8 km || 
|-id=170 bgcolor=#d6d6d6
| 191170 ||  || — || June 19, 2002 || Socorro || LINEAR || — || align=right | 7.3 km || 
|-id=171 bgcolor=#d6d6d6
| 191171 ||  || — || June 16, 2002 || Palomar || NEAT || — || align=right | 4.7 km || 
|-id=172 bgcolor=#d6d6d6
| 191172 ||  || — || June 20, 2002 || Palomar || NEAT || URS || align=right | 5.6 km || 
|-id=173 bgcolor=#d6d6d6
| 191173 ||  || — || July 4, 2002 || Palomar || NEAT || — || align=right | 5.8 km || 
|-id=174 bgcolor=#d6d6d6
| 191174 ||  || — || July 4, 2002 || Palomar || NEAT || — || align=right | 5.5 km || 
|-id=175 bgcolor=#d6d6d6
| 191175 ||  || — || July 9, 2002 || Socorro || LINEAR || URS || align=right | 6.4 km || 
|-id=176 bgcolor=#d6d6d6
| 191176 ||  || — || July 13, 2002 || Socorro || LINEAR || — || align=right | 11 km || 
|-id=177 bgcolor=#d6d6d6
| 191177 ||  || — || July 9, 2002 || Socorro || LINEAR || — || align=right | 3.6 km || 
|-id=178 bgcolor=#d6d6d6
| 191178 ||  || — || July 9, 2002 || Socorro || LINEAR || — || align=right | 6.0 km || 
|-id=179 bgcolor=#d6d6d6
| 191179 ||  || — || July 15, 2002 || Palomar || NEAT || URS || align=right | 5.6 km || 
|-id=180 bgcolor=#d6d6d6
| 191180 ||  || — || July 12, 2002 || Palomar || NEAT || — || align=right | 5.4 km || 
|-id=181 bgcolor=#d6d6d6
| 191181 ||  || — || July 14, 2002 || Palomar || NEAT || — || align=right | 4.5 km || 
|-id=182 bgcolor=#d6d6d6
| 191182 ||  || — || July 14, 2002 || Palomar || NEAT || — || align=right | 6.0 km || 
|-id=183 bgcolor=#d6d6d6
| 191183 ||  || — || July 12, 2002 || Palomar || NEAT || — || align=right | 5.7 km || 
|-id=184 bgcolor=#d6d6d6
| 191184 ||  || — || July 15, 2002 || Palomar || NEAT || TIR || align=right | 5.0 km || 
|-id=185 bgcolor=#d6d6d6
| 191185 ||  || — || July 22, 2002 || Palomar || NEAT || — || align=right | 5.2 km || 
|-id=186 bgcolor=#d6d6d6
| 191186 ||  || — || July 22, 2002 || Palomar || NEAT || — || align=right | 5.7 km || 
|-id=187 bgcolor=#d6d6d6
| 191187 ||  || — || July 16, 2002 || Haleakala || NEAT || — || align=right | 6.1 km || 
|-id=188 bgcolor=#d6d6d6
| 191188 ||  || — || July 18, 2002 || Socorro || LINEAR || EOS || align=right | 3.8 km || 
|-id=189 bgcolor=#d6d6d6
| 191189 ||  || — || July 18, 2002 || Socorro || LINEAR || — || align=right | 5.0 km || 
|-id=190 bgcolor=#d6d6d6
| 191190 ||  || — || July 23, 2002 || Palomar || NEAT || — || align=right | 8.8 km || 
|-id=191 bgcolor=#d6d6d6
| 191191 ||  || — || July 22, 2002 || Palomar || NEAT || 7:4 || align=right | 4.3 km || 
|-id=192 bgcolor=#d6d6d6
| 191192 ||  || — || August 4, 2002 || Palomar || NEAT || — || align=right | 5.4 km || 
|-id=193 bgcolor=#d6d6d6
| 191193 ||  || — || August 4, 2002 || Palomar || NEAT || — || align=right | 3.7 km || 
|-id=194 bgcolor=#d6d6d6
| 191194 ||  || — || August 4, 2002 || Palomar || NEAT || TIR || align=right | 3.1 km || 
|-id=195 bgcolor=#d6d6d6
| 191195 ||  || — || August 6, 2002 || Palomar || NEAT || HYG || align=right | 4.6 km || 
|-id=196 bgcolor=#d6d6d6
| 191196 ||  || — || August 6, 2002 || Palomar || NEAT || HYG || align=right | 4.7 km || 
|-id=197 bgcolor=#d6d6d6
| 191197 ||  || — || August 6, 2002 || Palomar || NEAT || HYG || align=right | 4.3 km || 
|-id=198 bgcolor=#d6d6d6
| 191198 ||  || — || August 10, 2002 || Socorro || LINEAR || LIX || align=right | 7.1 km || 
|-id=199 bgcolor=#d6d6d6
| 191199 ||  || — || August 10, 2002 || Socorro || LINEAR || ALA || align=right | 7.5 km || 
|-id=200 bgcolor=#d6d6d6
| 191200 ||  || — || August 11, 2002 || Socorro || LINEAR || — || align=right | 6.6 km || 
|}

191201–191300 

|-bgcolor=#d6d6d6
| 191201 ||  || — || August 12, 2002 || Socorro || LINEAR || — || align=right | 7.0 km || 
|-id=202 bgcolor=#d6d6d6
| 191202 ||  || — || August 9, 2002 || Socorro || LINEAR || — || align=right | 7.3 km || 
|-id=203 bgcolor=#d6d6d6
| 191203 ||  || — || August 12, 2002 || Haleakala || NEAT || — || align=right | 6.2 km || 
|-id=204 bgcolor=#d6d6d6
| 191204 ||  || — || August 14, 2002 || Socorro || LINEAR || — || align=right | 8.9 km || 
|-id=205 bgcolor=#d6d6d6
| 191205 ||  || — || August 12, 2002 || Socorro || LINEAR || — || align=right | 4.5 km || 
|-id=206 bgcolor=#d6d6d6
| 191206 ||  || — || August 13, 2002 || Anderson Mesa || LONEOS || URS || align=right | 6.8 km || 
|-id=207 bgcolor=#d6d6d6
| 191207 ||  || — || August 8, 2002 || Palomar || NEAT || KOR || align=right | 2.2 km || 
|-id=208 bgcolor=#d6d6d6
| 191208 ||  || — || August 29, 2002 || Palomar || NEAT || — || align=right | 6.9 km || 
|-id=209 bgcolor=#d6d6d6
| 191209 ||  || — || August 29, 2002 || Palomar || NEAT || — || align=right | 6.5 km || 
|-id=210 bgcolor=#d6d6d6
| 191210 ||  || — || August 29, 2002 || Palomar || NEAT || — || align=right | 4.7 km || 
|-id=211 bgcolor=#d6d6d6
| 191211 ||  || — || August 17, 2002 || Palomar || A. Lowe || — || align=right | 4.2 km || 
|-id=212 bgcolor=#d6d6d6
| 191212 ||  || — || August 29, 2002 || Palomar || NEAT || — || align=right | 3.7 km || 
|-id=213 bgcolor=#d6d6d6
| 191213 ||  || — || September 2, 2002 || Bagnall Beach || G. Crawford || — || align=right | 5.9 km || 
|-id=214 bgcolor=#d6d6d6
| 191214 ||  || — || September 4, 2002 || Anderson Mesa || LONEOS || VER || align=right | 6.9 km || 
|-id=215 bgcolor=#d6d6d6
| 191215 ||  || — || September 5, 2002 || Socorro || LINEAR || — || align=right | 6.7 km || 
|-id=216 bgcolor=#d6d6d6
| 191216 ||  || — || September 5, 2002 || Socorro || LINEAR || — || align=right | 5.5 km || 
|-id=217 bgcolor=#d6d6d6
| 191217 ||  || — || September 5, 2002 || Socorro || LINEAR || THM || align=right | 4.2 km || 
|-id=218 bgcolor=#d6d6d6
| 191218 ||  || — || September 5, 2002 || Socorro || LINEAR || — || align=right | 5.5 km || 
|-id=219 bgcolor=#d6d6d6
| 191219 ||  || — || September 4, 2002 || Palomar || NEAT || — || align=right | 5.2 km || 
|-id=220 bgcolor=#E9E9E9
| 191220 ||  || — || September 5, 2002 || Socorro || LINEAR || AGN || align=right | 2.1 km || 
|-id=221 bgcolor=#d6d6d6
| 191221 ||  || — || September 5, 2002 || Socorro || LINEAR || — || align=right | 7.2 km || 
|-id=222 bgcolor=#d6d6d6
| 191222 ||  || — || September 5, 2002 || Socorro || LINEAR || 7:4 || align=right | 3.8 km || 
|-id=223 bgcolor=#d6d6d6
| 191223 ||  || — || September 9, 2002 || Palomar || NEAT || — || align=right | 4.8 km || 
|-id=224 bgcolor=#d6d6d6
| 191224 ||  || — || September 11, 2002 || Palomar || NEAT || — || align=right | 6.1 km || 
|-id=225 bgcolor=#d6d6d6
| 191225 ||  || — || September 11, 2002 || Haleakala || NEAT || SYL7:4 || align=right | 9.2 km || 
|-id=226 bgcolor=#d6d6d6
| 191226 ||  || — || September 13, 2002 || Palomar || NEAT || ALA || align=right | 6.5 km || 
|-id=227 bgcolor=#d6d6d6
| 191227 ||  || — || September 1, 2002 || Haleakala || R. Matson || HYG || align=right | 6.1 km || 
|-id=228 bgcolor=#d6d6d6
| 191228 ||  || — || September 3, 2002 || Needville || J. Dellinger, W. G. Dillon || HYG || align=right | 4.2 km || 
|-id=229 bgcolor=#d6d6d6
| 191229 ||  || — || September 15, 2002 || Palomar || NEAT || EOS || align=right | 3.3 km || 
|-id=230 bgcolor=#d6d6d6
| 191230 ||  || — || September 26, 2002 || Haleakala || NEAT || — || align=right | 6.5 km || 
|-id=231 bgcolor=#d6d6d6
| 191231 ||  || — || September 27, 2002 || Palomar || NEAT || — || align=right | 5.8 km || 
|-id=232 bgcolor=#d6d6d6
| 191232 ||  || — || September 26, 2002 || Socorro || LINEAR || — || align=right | 5.5 km || 
|-id=233 bgcolor=#d6d6d6
| 191233 ||  || — || September 29, 2002 || Kitt Peak || Spacewatch || 7:4 || align=right | 3.9 km || 
|-id=234 bgcolor=#fefefe
| 191234 ||  || — || October 2, 2002 || Socorro || LINEAR || — || align=right data-sort-value="0.95" | 950 m || 
|-id=235 bgcolor=#d6d6d6
| 191235 ||  || — || October 3, 2002 || Campo Imperatore || CINEOS || — || align=right | 6.2 km || 
|-id=236 bgcolor=#fefefe
| 191236 ||  || — || October 4, 2002 || Anderson Mesa || LONEOS || — || align=right | 1.2 km || 
|-id=237 bgcolor=#d6d6d6
| 191237 ||  || — || October 4, 2002 || Socorro || LINEAR || 7:4 || align=right | 6.8 km || 
|-id=238 bgcolor=#d6d6d6
| 191238 ||  || — || October 31, 2002 || Palomar || NEAT || — || align=right | 3.7 km || 
|-id=239 bgcolor=#fefefe
| 191239 ||  || — || November 4, 2002 || Kitt Peak || Spacewatch || — || align=right data-sort-value="0.79" | 790 m || 
|-id=240 bgcolor=#fefefe
| 191240 ||  || — || November 5, 2002 || Socorro || LINEAR || — || align=right data-sort-value="0.98" | 980 m || 
|-id=241 bgcolor=#fefefe
| 191241 ||  || — || November 12, 2002 || Socorro || LINEAR || — || align=right data-sort-value="0.98" | 980 m || 
|-id=242 bgcolor=#fefefe
| 191242 ||  || — || December 6, 2002 || Socorro || LINEAR || H || align=right | 1.1 km || 
|-id=243 bgcolor=#fefefe
| 191243 ||  || — || December 10, 2002 || Socorro || LINEAR || — || align=right | 1.2 km || 
|-id=244 bgcolor=#fefefe
| 191244 ||  || — || December 27, 2002 || Anderson Mesa || LONEOS || — || align=right | 1.5 km || 
|-id=245 bgcolor=#fefefe
| 191245 ||  || — || December 31, 2002 || Socorro || LINEAR || — || align=right | 1.3 km || 
|-id=246 bgcolor=#fefefe
| 191246 ||  || — || December 31, 2002 || Socorro || LINEAR || — || align=right | 1.4 km || 
|-id=247 bgcolor=#fefefe
| 191247 ||  || — || December 31, 2002 || Socorro || LINEAR || — || align=right | 1.4 km || 
|-id=248 bgcolor=#fefefe
| 191248 ||  || — || December 31, 2002 || Socorro || LINEAR || — || align=right | 1.2 km || 
|-id=249 bgcolor=#fefefe
| 191249 ||  || — || January 7, 2003 || Socorro || LINEAR || FLO || align=right data-sort-value="0.97" | 970 m || 
|-id=250 bgcolor=#fefefe
| 191250 ||  || — || January 7, 2003 || Socorro || LINEAR || FLO || align=right | 1.0 km || 
|-id=251 bgcolor=#fefefe
| 191251 ||  || — || January 5, 2003 || Anderson Mesa || LONEOS || — || align=right | 1.2 km || 
|-id=252 bgcolor=#fefefe
| 191252 ||  || — || January 26, 2003 || Haleakala || NEAT || — || align=right | 1.2 km || 
|-id=253 bgcolor=#fefefe
| 191253 ||  || — || January 26, 2003 || Anderson Mesa || LONEOS || — || align=right | 1.3 km || 
|-id=254 bgcolor=#fefefe
| 191254 ||  || — || January 26, 2003 || Palomar || NEAT || — || align=right | 1.1 km || 
|-id=255 bgcolor=#fefefe
| 191255 ||  || — || January 27, 2003 || Socorro || LINEAR || — || align=right | 1.1 km || 
|-id=256 bgcolor=#fefefe
| 191256 ||  || — || January 26, 2003 || Palomar || NEAT || — || align=right | 1.0 km || 
|-id=257 bgcolor=#fefefe
| 191257 ||  || — || January 27, 2003 || Haleakala || NEAT || — || align=right | 1.1 km || 
|-id=258 bgcolor=#fefefe
| 191258 ||  || — || January 28, 2003 || Socorro || LINEAR || FLO || align=right | 1.1 km || 
|-id=259 bgcolor=#fefefe
| 191259 ||  || — || January 28, 2003 || Kitt Peak || Spacewatch || — || align=right | 1.3 km || 
|-id=260 bgcolor=#fefefe
| 191260 ||  || — || January 27, 2003 || Anderson Mesa || LONEOS || NYS || align=right | 2.3 km || 
|-id=261 bgcolor=#fefefe
| 191261 ||  || — || January 27, 2003 || Anderson Mesa || LONEOS || NYS || align=right | 1.1 km || 
|-id=262 bgcolor=#fefefe
| 191262 ||  || — || January 27, 2003 || Palomar || NEAT || — || align=right | 1.9 km || 
|-id=263 bgcolor=#fefefe
| 191263 ||  || — || January 27, 2003 || Haleakala || NEAT || — || align=right | 1.1 km || 
|-id=264 bgcolor=#fefefe
| 191264 ||  || — || January 27, 2003 || Palomar || NEAT || NYS || align=right | 1.2 km || 
|-id=265 bgcolor=#fefefe
| 191265 ||  || — || January 30, 2003 || Socorro || LINEAR || FLO || align=right data-sort-value="0.98" | 980 m || 
|-id=266 bgcolor=#fefefe
| 191266 ||  || — || January 30, 2003 || Haleakala || NEAT || MAS || align=right | 1.2 km || 
|-id=267 bgcolor=#fefefe
| 191267 ||  || — || February 3, 2003 || Kitt Peak || Spacewatch || V || align=right | 1.2 km || 
|-id=268 bgcolor=#fefefe
| 191268 ||  || — || February 4, 2003 || La Silla || C. Barbieri || FLO || align=right data-sort-value="0.85" | 850 m || 
|-id=269 bgcolor=#fefefe
| 191269 ||  || — || February 21, 2003 || Palomar || NEAT || V || align=right data-sort-value="0.97" | 970 m || 
|-id=270 bgcolor=#fefefe
| 191270 ||  || — || February 26, 2003 || Haleakala || NEAT || — || align=right | 1.7 km || 
|-id=271 bgcolor=#fefefe
| 191271 ||  || — || March 5, 2003 || Socorro || LINEAR || — || align=right | 1.2 km || 
|-id=272 bgcolor=#fefefe
| 191272 ||  || — || March 6, 2003 || Anderson Mesa || LONEOS || NYS || align=right | 2.5 km || 
|-id=273 bgcolor=#fefefe
| 191273 ||  || — || March 6, 2003 || Palomar || NEAT || MAS || align=right data-sort-value="0.95" | 950 m || 
|-id=274 bgcolor=#fefefe
| 191274 ||  || — || March 6, 2003 || Palomar || NEAT || V || align=right | 1.0 km || 
|-id=275 bgcolor=#fefefe
| 191275 ||  || — || March 6, 2003 || Anderson Mesa || LONEOS || MAS || align=right | 1.0 km || 
|-id=276 bgcolor=#fefefe
| 191276 ||  || — || March 6, 2003 || Anderson Mesa || LONEOS || NYS || align=right data-sort-value="0.84" | 840 m || 
|-id=277 bgcolor=#fefefe
| 191277 ||  || — || March 6, 2003 || Socorro || LINEAR || — || align=right | 1.4 km || 
|-id=278 bgcolor=#E9E9E9
| 191278 ||  || — || March 8, 2003 || Anderson Mesa || LONEOS || — || align=right | 2.6 km || 
|-id=279 bgcolor=#d6d6d6
| 191279 ||  || — || March 11, 2003 || Palomar || NEAT || — || align=right | 3.9 km || 
|-id=280 bgcolor=#E9E9E9
| 191280 ||  || — || March 9, 2003 || Palomar || NEAT || — || align=right | 1.8 km || 
|-id=281 bgcolor=#E9E9E9
| 191281 ||  || — || March 9, 2003 || Socorro || LINEAR || — || align=right | 1.7 km || 
|-id=282 bgcolor=#fefefe
| 191282 Feustel || 2003 FS ||  || March 22, 2003 || Kleť || KLENOT || NYS || align=right | 1.2 km || 
|-id=283 bgcolor=#E9E9E9
| 191283 ||  || — || March 23, 2003 || Kitt Peak || Spacewatch || — || align=right | 1.5 km || 
|-id=284 bgcolor=#fefefe
| 191284 ||  || — || March 23, 2003 || Kitt Peak || Spacewatch || NYS || align=right | 1.1 km || 
|-id=285 bgcolor=#fefefe
| 191285 ||  || — || March 26, 2003 || Kitt Peak || Spacewatch || — || align=right | 1.8 km || 
|-id=286 bgcolor=#fefefe
| 191286 ||  || — || March 26, 2003 || Kitt Peak || Spacewatch || V || align=right | 1.0 km || 
|-id=287 bgcolor=#E9E9E9
| 191287 ||  || — || March 26, 2003 || Haleakala || NEAT || — || align=right | 2.7 km || 
|-id=288 bgcolor=#E9E9E9
| 191288 ||  || — || March 27, 2003 || Palomar || NEAT || — || align=right | 3.1 km || 
|-id=289 bgcolor=#E9E9E9
| 191289 ||  || — || March 29, 2003 || Anderson Mesa || LONEOS || — || align=right | 3.3 km || 
|-id=290 bgcolor=#E9E9E9
| 191290 ||  || — || March 31, 2003 || Kitt Peak || Spacewatch || — || align=right | 1.6 km || 
|-id=291 bgcolor=#C2FFFF
| 191291 ||  || — || March 24, 2003 || Kitt Peak || Spacewatch || L4 || align=right | 15 km || 
|-id=292 bgcolor=#E9E9E9
| 191292 ||  || — || March 30, 2003 || Socorro || LINEAR || — || align=right | 1.8 km || 
|-id=293 bgcolor=#E9E9E9
| 191293 ||  || — || March 30, 2003 || Socorro || LINEAR || — || align=right | 4.7 km || 
|-id=294 bgcolor=#E9E9E9
| 191294 ||  || — || March 31, 2003 || Anderson Mesa || LONEOS || — || align=right | 1.5 km || 
|-id=295 bgcolor=#fefefe
| 191295 ||  || — || March 30, 2003 || Kitt Peak || Spacewatch || — || align=right | 2.0 km || 
|-id=296 bgcolor=#E9E9E9
| 191296 ||  || — || March 29, 2003 || Anderson Mesa || LONEOS || — || align=right | 1.2 km || 
|-id=297 bgcolor=#E9E9E9
| 191297 ||  || — || April 1, 2003 || Palomar || NEAT || — || align=right | 1.0 km || 
|-id=298 bgcolor=#E9E9E9
| 191298 ||  || — || April 3, 2003 || Anderson Mesa || LONEOS || — || align=right | 1.1 km || 
|-id=299 bgcolor=#E9E9E9
| 191299 ||  || — || April 2, 2003 || Socorro || LINEAR || — || align=right | 1.3 km || 
|-id=300 bgcolor=#E9E9E9
| 191300 ||  || — || April 2, 2003 || Socorro || LINEAR || — || align=right | 1.5 km || 
|}

191301–191400 

|-bgcolor=#E9E9E9
| 191301 ||  || — || April 1, 2003 || Socorro || LINEAR || — || align=right | 2.4 km || 
|-id=302 bgcolor=#fefefe
| 191302 ||  || — || April 8, 2003 || Socorro || LINEAR || FLO || align=right | 1.7 km || 
|-id=303 bgcolor=#C2FFFF
| 191303 ||  || — || April 5, 2003 || Anderson Mesa || LONEOS || L4 || align=right | 18 km || 
|-id=304 bgcolor=#E9E9E9
| 191304 ||  || — || April 9, 2003 || Socorro || LINEAR || EUN || align=right | 2.2 km || 
|-id=305 bgcolor=#fefefe
| 191305 ||  || — || April 24, 2003 || Anderson Mesa || LONEOS || — || align=right | 1.5 km || 
|-id=306 bgcolor=#E9E9E9
| 191306 ||  || — || April 24, 2003 || Anderson Mesa || LONEOS || — || align=right | 2.0 km || 
|-id=307 bgcolor=#E9E9E9
| 191307 ||  || — || April 27, 2003 || Anderson Mesa || LONEOS || — || align=right | 3.2 km || 
|-id=308 bgcolor=#E9E9E9
| 191308 ||  || — || April 28, 2003 || Anderson Mesa || LONEOS || — || align=right | 1.8 km || 
|-id=309 bgcolor=#E9E9E9
| 191309 ||  || — || April 28, 2003 || Haleakala || NEAT || — || align=right | 3.5 km || 
|-id=310 bgcolor=#E9E9E9
| 191310 ||  || — || April 28, 2003 || Anderson Mesa || LONEOS || ADE || align=right | 3.0 km || 
|-id=311 bgcolor=#E9E9E9
| 191311 ||  || — || April 28, 2003 || Anderson Mesa || LONEOS || — || align=right | 1.7 km || 
|-id=312 bgcolor=#E9E9E9
| 191312 ||  || — || April 29, 2003 || Haleakala || NEAT || — || align=right | 2.8 km || 
|-id=313 bgcolor=#E9E9E9
| 191313 ||  || — || April 29, 2003 || Haleakala || NEAT || EUN || align=right | 1.9 km || 
|-id=314 bgcolor=#E9E9E9
| 191314 ||  || — || April 27, 2003 || Anderson Mesa || LONEOS || — || align=right | 1.5 km || 
|-id=315 bgcolor=#E9E9E9
| 191315 ||  || — || April 28, 2003 || Socorro || LINEAR || — || align=right | 5.1 km || 
|-id=316 bgcolor=#E9E9E9
| 191316 ||  || — || April 30, 2003 || Socorro || LINEAR || EUN || align=right | 3.3 km || 
|-id=317 bgcolor=#E9E9E9
| 191317 ||  || — || April 25, 2003 || Campo Imperatore || CINEOS || — || align=right | 1.7 km || 
|-id=318 bgcolor=#E9E9E9
| 191318 ||  || — || April 25, 2003 || Apache Point || SDSS || — || align=right | 3.5 km || 
|-id=319 bgcolor=#E9E9E9
| 191319 ||  || — || May 2, 2003 || Socorro || LINEAR || ADE || align=right | 3.7 km || 
|-id=320 bgcolor=#E9E9E9
| 191320 ||  || — || May 4, 2003 || Bergisch Gladbach || W. Bickel || MIT || align=right | 4.4 km || 
|-id=321 bgcolor=#E9E9E9
| 191321 ||  || — || May 1, 2003 || Kitt Peak || Spacewatch || EUN || align=right | 2.0 km || 
|-id=322 bgcolor=#E9E9E9
| 191322 || 2003 KJ || — || May 20, 2003 || Anderson Mesa || LONEOS || — || align=right | 2.8 km || 
|-id=323 bgcolor=#E9E9E9
| 191323 || 2003 KN || — || May 22, 2003 || Wrightwood || J. W. Young || — || align=right | 2.0 km || 
|-id=324 bgcolor=#E9E9E9
| 191324 ||  || — || May 23, 2003 || Reedy Creek || J. Broughton || — || align=right | 3.5 km || 
|-id=325 bgcolor=#E9E9E9
| 191325 ||  || — || June 3, 2003 || Socorro || LINEAR || — || align=right | 4.0 km || 
|-id=326 bgcolor=#E9E9E9
| 191326 ||  || — || June 26, 2003 || Socorro || LINEAR || — || align=right | 4.6 km || 
|-id=327 bgcolor=#E9E9E9
| 191327 ||  || — || June 29, 2003 || Socorro || LINEAR || — || align=right | 5.6 km || 
|-id=328 bgcolor=#E9E9E9
| 191328 ||  || — || July 21, 2003 || Haleakala || NEAT || JUN || align=right | 1.7 km || 
|-id=329 bgcolor=#E9E9E9
| 191329 ||  || — || July 24, 2003 || Campo Imperatore || CINEOS || — || align=right | 3.7 km || 
|-id=330 bgcolor=#d6d6d6
| 191330 ||  || — || July 24, 2003 || Palomar || NEAT || KOR || align=right | 2.5 km || 
|-id=331 bgcolor=#d6d6d6
| 191331 ||  || — || July 24, 2003 || Palomar || NEAT || KOR || align=right | 2.2 km || 
|-id=332 bgcolor=#E9E9E9
| 191332 ||  || — || August 1, 2003 || Haleakala || NEAT || — || align=right | 4.3 km || 
|-id=333 bgcolor=#d6d6d6
| 191333 ||  || — || August 19, 2003 || Campo Imperatore || CINEOS || — || align=right | 4.0 km || 
|-id=334 bgcolor=#d6d6d6
| 191334 ||  || — || August 19, 2003 || Campo Imperatore || CINEOS || KOR || align=right | 2.5 km || 
|-id=335 bgcolor=#d6d6d6
| 191335 ||  || — || August 20, 2003 || Campo Imperatore || CINEOS || — || align=right | 3.4 km || 
|-id=336 bgcolor=#d6d6d6
| 191336 ||  || — || August 21, 2003 || Palomar || NEAT || — || align=right | 3.6 km || 
|-id=337 bgcolor=#d6d6d6
| 191337 ||  || — || August 21, 2003 || Haleakala || NEAT || BRA || align=right | 2.8 km || 
|-id=338 bgcolor=#d6d6d6
| 191338 ||  || — || August 22, 2003 || Haleakala || NEAT || — || align=right | 4.8 km || 
|-id=339 bgcolor=#d6d6d6
| 191339 ||  || — || August 22, 2003 || Palomar || NEAT || — || align=right | 4.0 km || 
|-id=340 bgcolor=#d6d6d6
| 191340 ||  || — || August 20, 2003 || Palomar || NEAT || EOS || align=right | 3.8 km || 
|-id=341 bgcolor=#d6d6d6
| 191341 Lánczos ||  ||  || August 24, 2003 || Piszkéstető || K. Sárneczky, B. Sipőcz || — || align=right | 2.5 km || 
|-id=342 bgcolor=#d6d6d6
| 191342 ||  || — || August 21, 2003 || Palomar || NEAT || CHA || align=right | 3.8 km || 
|-id=343 bgcolor=#E9E9E9
| 191343 ||  || — || August 22, 2003 || Socorro || LINEAR || GEF || align=right | 2.4 km || 
|-id=344 bgcolor=#E9E9E9
| 191344 ||  || — || August 22, 2003 || Palomar || NEAT || — || align=right | 5.8 km || 
|-id=345 bgcolor=#d6d6d6
| 191345 ||  || — || August 22, 2003 || Palomar || NEAT || EOS || align=right | 3.3 km || 
|-id=346 bgcolor=#d6d6d6
| 191346 ||  || — || August 22, 2003 || Palomar || NEAT || — || align=right | 4.3 km || 
|-id=347 bgcolor=#d6d6d6
| 191347 ||  || — || August 22, 2003 || Socorro || LINEAR || — || align=right | 5.7 km || 
|-id=348 bgcolor=#d6d6d6
| 191348 ||  || — || August 22, 2003 || Socorro || LINEAR || — || align=right | 3.8 km || 
|-id=349 bgcolor=#d6d6d6
| 191349 ||  || — || August 23, 2003 || Palomar || NEAT || — || align=right | 3.8 km || 
|-id=350 bgcolor=#d6d6d6
| 191350 ||  || — || August 20, 2003 || Palomar || NEAT || — || align=right | 4.7 km || 
|-id=351 bgcolor=#d6d6d6
| 191351 ||  || — || August 23, 2003 || Palomar || NEAT || — || align=right | 6.4 km || 
|-id=352 bgcolor=#d6d6d6
| 191352 ||  || — || August 22, 2003 || Socorro || LINEAR || HYG || align=right | 5.1 km || 
|-id=353 bgcolor=#d6d6d6
| 191353 ||  || — || August 23, 2003 || Socorro || LINEAR || — || align=right | 7.4 km || 
|-id=354 bgcolor=#d6d6d6
| 191354 ||  || — || August 23, 2003 || Palomar || NEAT || — || align=right | 4.5 km || 
|-id=355 bgcolor=#d6d6d6
| 191355 ||  || — || August 24, 2003 || Socorro || LINEAR || — || align=right | 5.6 km || 
|-id=356 bgcolor=#E9E9E9
| 191356 ||  || — || August 24, 2003 || Socorro || LINEAR || — || align=right | 4.6 km || 
|-id=357 bgcolor=#E9E9E9
| 191357 ||  || — || August 24, 2003 || Socorro || LINEAR || JUN || align=right | 1.8 km || 
|-id=358 bgcolor=#d6d6d6
| 191358 ||  || — || August 22, 2003 || Palomar || NEAT || KOR || align=right | 1.9 km || 
|-id=359 bgcolor=#d6d6d6
| 191359 ||  || — || August 23, 2003 || Palomar || NEAT || KOR || align=right | 1.8 km || 
|-id=360 bgcolor=#d6d6d6
| 191360 ||  || — || August 24, 2003 || Socorro || LINEAR || — || align=right | 3.3 km || 
|-id=361 bgcolor=#d6d6d6
| 191361 ||  || — || August 25, 2003 || Socorro || LINEAR || — || align=right | 5.2 km || 
|-id=362 bgcolor=#d6d6d6
| 191362 ||  || — || August 25, 2003 || Socorro || LINEAR || — || align=right | 3.7 km || 
|-id=363 bgcolor=#E9E9E9
| 191363 ||  || — || August 28, 2003 || Haleakala || NEAT || — || align=right | 4.1 km || 
|-id=364 bgcolor=#E9E9E9
| 191364 ||  || — || August 28, 2003 || Haleakala || NEAT || WAT || align=right | 3.8 km || 
|-id=365 bgcolor=#d6d6d6
| 191365 ||  || — || August 30, 2003 || Kitt Peak || Spacewatch || — || align=right | 4.3 km || 
|-id=366 bgcolor=#E9E9E9
| 191366 ||  || — || August 31, 2003 || Socorro || LINEAR || — || align=right | 4.3 km || 
|-id=367 bgcolor=#d6d6d6
| 191367 ||  || — || August 31, 2003 || Socorro || LINEAR || EUP || align=right | 6.2 km || 
|-id=368 bgcolor=#d6d6d6
| 191368 ||  || — || September 3, 2003 || Socorro || LINEAR || TIR || align=right | 5.4 km || 
|-id=369 bgcolor=#E9E9E9
| 191369 ||  || — || September 3, 2003 || Reedy Creek || J. Broughton || — || align=right | 4.1 km || 
|-id=370 bgcolor=#d6d6d6
| 191370 ||  || — || September 4, 2003 || Socorro || LINEAR || — || align=right | 4.2 km || 
|-id=371 bgcolor=#d6d6d6
| 191371 ||  || — || September 4, 2003 || Campo Imperatore || CINEOS || — || align=right | 4.4 km || 
|-id=372 bgcolor=#d6d6d6
| 191372 ||  || — || September 15, 2003 || Palomar || NEAT || — || align=right | 6.5 km || 
|-id=373 bgcolor=#d6d6d6
| 191373 ||  || — || September 15, 2003 || Haleakala || NEAT || EOS || align=right | 3.8 km || 
|-id=374 bgcolor=#d6d6d6
| 191374 ||  || — || September 14, 2003 || Haleakala || NEAT || TEL || align=right | 2.5 km || 
|-id=375 bgcolor=#d6d6d6
| 191375 ||  || — || September 3, 2003 || Haleakala || NEAT || EUP || align=right | 6.6 km || 
|-id=376 bgcolor=#d6d6d6
| 191376 ||  || — || September 2, 2003 || Socorro || LINEAR || KOR || align=right | 2.4 km || 
|-id=377 bgcolor=#d6d6d6
| 191377 || 2003 SQ || — || September 16, 2003 || Kitt Peak || Spacewatch || — || align=right | 4.1 km || 
|-id=378 bgcolor=#d6d6d6
| 191378 ||  || — || September 16, 2003 || Kitt Peak || Spacewatch || — || align=right | 5.7 km || 
|-id=379 bgcolor=#d6d6d6
| 191379 ||  || — || September 16, 2003 || Palomar || NEAT || — || align=right | 4.8 km || 
|-id=380 bgcolor=#d6d6d6
| 191380 ||  || — || September 16, 2003 || Kitt Peak || Spacewatch || — || align=right | 3.5 km || 
|-id=381 bgcolor=#E9E9E9
| 191381 ||  || — || September 18, 2003 || Campo Imperatore || CINEOS || — || align=right | 4.1 km || 
|-id=382 bgcolor=#d6d6d6
| 191382 ||  || — || September 16, 2003 || Kitt Peak || Spacewatch || — || align=right | 2.5 km || 
|-id=383 bgcolor=#d6d6d6
| 191383 ||  || — || September 16, 2003 || Kitt Peak || Spacewatch || — || align=right | 2.9 km || 
|-id=384 bgcolor=#d6d6d6
| 191384 ||  || — || September 18, 2003 || Palomar || NEAT || — || align=right | 5.8 km || 
|-id=385 bgcolor=#d6d6d6
| 191385 ||  || — || September 16, 2003 || Palomar || NEAT || — || align=right | 4.2 km || 
|-id=386 bgcolor=#d6d6d6
| 191386 ||  || — || September 16, 2003 || Palomar || NEAT || — || align=right | 5.7 km || 
|-id=387 bgcolor=#d6d6d6
| 191387 ||  || — || September 16, 2003 || Palomar || NEAT || — || align=right | 5.6 km || 
|-id=388 bgcolor=#d6d6d6
| 191388 ||  || — || September 16, 2003 || Palomar || NEAT || — || align=right | 6.9 km || 
|-id=389 bgcolor=#E9E9E9
| 191389 ||  || — || September 16, 2003 || Anderson Mesa || LONEOS || GEF || align=right | 2.2 km || 
|-id=390 bgcolor=#d6d6d6
| 191390 ||  || — || September 16, 2003 || Anderson Mesa || LONEOS || — || align=right | 3.7 km || 
|-id=391 bgcolor=#d6d6d6
| 191391 ||  || — || September 16, 2003 || Anderson Mesa || LONEOS || — || align=right | 5.3 km || 
|-id=392 bgcolor=#d6d6d6
| 191392 ||  || — || September 16, 2003 || Anderson Mesa || LONEOS || — || align=right | 4.4 km || 
|-id=393 bgcolor=#d6d6d6
| 191393 ||  || — || September 17, 2003 || Haleakala || NEAT || ALA || align=right | 6.7 km || 
|-id=394 bgcolor=#d6d6d6
| 191394 ||  || — || September 18, 2003 || Palomar || NEAT || — || align=right | 4.7 km || 
|-id=395 bgcolor=#d6d6d6
| 191395 ||  || — || September 18, 2003 || Palomar || NEAT || — || align=right | 6.1 km || 
|-id=396 bgcolor=#d6d6d6
| 191396 ||  || — || September 18, 2003 || Palomar || NEAT || — || align=right | 3.7 km || 
|-id=397 bgcolor=#d6d6d6
| 191397 ||  || — || September 17, 2003 || Anderson Mesa || LONEOS || — || align=right | 4.7 km || 
|-id=398 bgcolor=#d6d6d6
| 191398 ||  || — || September 17, 2003 || Socorro || LINEAR || TEL || align=right | 2.2 km || 
|-id=399 bgcolor=#d6d6d6
| 191399 ||  || — || September 19, 2003 || Socorro || LINEAR || — || align=right | 6.6 km || 
|-id=400 bgcolor=#d6d6d6
| 191400 ||  || — || September 18, 2003 || Kitt Peak || Spacewatch || — || align=right | 3.9 km || 
|}

191401–191500 

|-bgcolor=#d6d6d6
| 191401 ||  || — || September 18, 2003 || Kitt Peak || Spacewatch || — || align=right | 4.1 km || 
|-id=402 bgcolor=#d6d6d6
| 191402 ||  || — || September 18, 2003 || Kitt Peak || Spacewatch || — || align=right | 4.8 km || 
|-id=403 bgcolor=#d6d6d6
| 191403 ||  || — || September 19, 2003 || Kitt Peak || Spacewatch || — || align=right | 4.1 km || 
|-id=404 bgcolor=#d6d6d6
| 191404 ||  || — || September 19, 2003 || Kitt Peak || Spacewatch || — || align=right | 3.4 km || 
|-id=405 bgcolor=#d6d6d6
| 191405 ||  || — || September 17, 2003 || Kitt Peak || Spacewatch || VER || align=right | 6.0 km || 
|-id=406 bgcolor=#d6d6d6
| 191406 ||  || — || September 17, 2003 || Kitt Peak || Spacewatch || — || align=right | 3.3 km || 
|-id=407 bgcolor=#d6d6d6
| 191407 ||  || — || September 16, 2003 || Palomar || NEAT || NAE || align=right | 5.2 km || 
|-id=408 bgcolor=#d6d6d6
| 191408 ||  || — || September 16, 2003 || Palomar || NEAT || — || align=right | 6.0 km || 
|-id=409 bgcolor=#d6d6d6
| 191409 ||  || — || September 18, 2003 || Campo Imperatore || CINEOS || KOR || align=right | 2.2 km || 
|-id=410 bgcolor=#d6d6d6
| 191410 ||  || — || September 18, 2003 || Kitt Peak || Spacewatch || — || align=right | 5.8 km || 
|-id=411 bgcolor=#d6d6d6
| 191411 ||  || — || September 18, 2003 || Kitt Peak || Spacewatch || — || align=right | 5.0 km || 
|-id=412 bgcolor=#d6d6d6
| 191412 ||  || — || September 20, 2003 || Socorro || LINEAR || — || align=right | 3.4 km || 
|-id=413 bgcolor=#d6d6d6
| 191413 ||  || — || September 20, 2003 || Socorro || LINEAR || — || align=right | 5.9 km || 
|-id=414 bgcolor=#d6d6d6
| 191414 ||  || — || September 20, 2003 || Kitt Peak || Spacewatch || — || align=right | 3.2 km || 
|-id=415 bgcolor=#d6d6d6
| 191415 ||  || — || September 20, 2003 || Palomar || NEAT || HYG || align=right | 5.9 km || 
|-id=416 bgcolor=#d6d6d6
| 191416 ||  || — || September 17, 2003 || Kitt Peak || Spacewatch || — || align=right | 5.1 km || 
|-id=417 bgcolor=#d6d6d6
| 191417 ||  || — || September 21, 2003 || Campo Imperatore || CINEOS || — || align=right | 4.0 km || 
|-id=418 bgcolor=#d6d6d6
| 191418 ||  || — || September 20, 2003 || Palomar || NEAT || — || align=right | 4.2 km || 
|-id=419 bgcolor=#d6d6d6
| 191419 ||  || — || September 21, 2003 || Socorro || LINEAR || EMA || align=right | 7.7 km || 
|-id=420 bgcolor=#d6d6d6
| 191420 ||  || — || September 18, 2003 || Socorro || LINEAR || — || align=right | 4.7 km || 
|-id=421 bgcolor=#d6d6d6
| 191421 ||  || — || September 20, 2003 || Palomar || NEAT || — || align=right | 6.3 km || 
|-id=422 bgcolor=#d6d6d6
| 191422 ||  || — || September 20, 2003 || Palomar || NEAT || EOS || align=right | 3.7 km || 
|-id=423 bgcolor=#d6d6d6
| 191423 ||  || — || September 20, 2003 || Palomar || NEAT || — || align=right | 5.7 km || 
|-id=424 bgcolor=#d6d6d6
| 191424 ||  || — || September 20, 2003 || Palomar || NEAT || — || align=right | 7.2 km || 
|-id=425 bgcolor=#d6d6d6
| 191425 ||  || — || September 16, 2003 || Kitt Peak || Spacewatch || — || align=right | 3.9 km || 
|-id=426 bgcolor=#d6d6d6
| 191426 ||  || — || September 17, 2003 || Socorro || LINEAR || EOS || align=right | 3.8 km || 
|-id=427 bgcolor=#d6d6d6
| 191427 ||  || — || September 19, 2003 || Anderson Mesa || LONEOS || — || align=right | 6.5 km || 
|-id=428 bgcolor=#d6d6d6
| 191428 ||  || — || September 19, 2003 || Anderson Mesa || LONEOS || EOS || align=right | 3.6 km || 
|-id=429 bgcolor=#E9E9E9
| 191429 ||  || — || September 19, 2003 || Anderson Mesa || LONEOS || HOF || align=right | 4.4 km || 
|-id=430 bgcolor=#d6d6d6
| 191430 ||  || — || September 21, 2003 || Socorro || LINEAR || NAE || align=right | 5.4 km || 
|-id=431 bgcolor=#d6d6d6
| 191431 ||  || — || September 20, 2003 || Palomar || NEAT || — || align=right | 3.8 km || 
|-id=432 bgcolor=#d6d6d6
| 191432 ||  || — || September 19, 2003 || Kitt Peak || Spacewatch || — || align=right | 4.5 km || 
|-id=433 bgcolor=#d6d6d6
| 191433 ||  || — || September 23, 2003 || Haleakala || NEAT || — || align=right | 2.9 km || 
|-id=434 bgcolor=#d6d6d6
| 191434 ||  || — || September 18, 2003 || Socorro || LINEAR || — || align=right | 4.5 km || 
|-id=435 bgcolor=#d6d6d6
| 191435 ||  || — || September 18, 2003 || Palomar || NEAT || — || align=right | 4.6 km || 
|-id=436 bgcolor=#d6d6d6
| 191436 ||  || — || September 18, 2003 || Palomar || NEAT || — || align=right | 4.5 km || 
|-id=437 bgcolor=#d6d6d6
| 191437 ||  || — || September 18, 2003 || Palomar || NEAT || — || align=right | 5.9 km || 
|-id=438 bgcolor=#d6d6d6
| 191438 ||  || — || September 19, 2003 || Socorro || LINEAR || — || align=right | 5.3 km || 
|-id=439 bgcolor=#d6d6d6
| 191439 ||  || — || September 20, 2003 || Socorro || LINEAR || — || align=right | 5.8 km || 
|-id=440 bgcolor=#d6d6d6
| 191440 ||  || — || September 20, 2003 || Campo Imperatore || CINEOS || — || align=right | 5.3 km || 
|-id=441 bgcolor=#d6d6d6
| 191441 ||  || — || September 22, 2003 || Anderson Mesa || LONEOS || EOS || align=right | 6.2 km || 
|-id=442 bgcolor=#d6d6d6
| 191442 ||  || — || September 22, 2003 || Anderson Mesa || LONEOS || TEL || align=right | 3.2 km || 
|-id=443 bgcolor=#d6d6d6
| 191443 ||  || — || September 20, 2003 || Campo Imperatore || CINEOS || VER || align=right | 6.0 km || 
|-id=444 bgcolor=#d6d6d6
| 191444 ||  || — || September 20, 2003 || Socorro || LINEAR || — || align=right | 4.1 km || 
|-id=445 bgcolor=#d6d6d6
| 191445 ||  || — || September 20, 2003 || Anderson Mesa || LONEOS || — || align=right | 3.6 km || 
|-id=446 bgcolor=#d6d6d6
| 191446 ||  || — || September 21, 2003 || Anderson Mesa || LONEOS || — || align=right | 6.1 km || 
|-id=447 bgcolor=#d6d6d6
| 191447 ||  || — || September 26, 2003 || Desert Eagle || W. K. Y. Yeung || — || align=right | 6.7 km || 
|-id=448 bgcolor=#d6d6d6
| 191448 ||  || — || September 22, 2003 || Anderson Mesa || LONEOS || — || align=right | 4.9 km || 
|-id=449 bgcolor=#d6d6d6
| 191449 ||  || — || September 23, 2003 || Palomar || NEAT || — || align=right | 4.8 km || 
|-id=450 bgcolor=#d6d6d6
| 191450 ||  || — || September 23, 2003 || Palomar || NEAT || — || align=right | 4.4 km || 
|-id=451 bgcolor=#d6d6d6
| 191451 ||  || — || September 25, 2003 || Palomar || NEAT || EOS || align=right | 5.3 km || 
|-id=452 bgcolor=#d6d6d6
| 191452 ||  || — || September 26, 2003 || Socorro || LINEAR || THM || align=right | 5.2 km || 
|-id=453 bgcolor=#d6d6d6
| 191453 ||  || — || September 27, 2003 || Desert Eagle || W. K. Y. Yeung || — || align=right | 6.7 km || 
|-id=454 bgcolor=#fefefe
| 191454 ||  || — || September 28, 2003 || Socorro || LINEAR || H || align=right data-sort-value="0.98" | 980 m || 
|-id=455 bgcolor=#d6d6d6
| 191455 ||  || — || September 26, 2003 || Socorro || LINEAR || — || align=right | 3.5 km || 
|-id=456 bgcolor=#d6d6d6
| 191456 ||  || — || September 26, 2003 || Socorro || LINEAR || — || align=right | 3.7 km || 
|-id=457 bgcolor=#d6d6d6
| 191457 ||  || — || September 24, 2003 || Palomar || NEAT || — || align=right | 5.5 km || 
|-id=458 bgcolor=#d6d6d6
| 191458 ||  || — || September 26, 2003 || Socorro || LINEAR || KOR || align=right | 2.1 km || 
|-id=459 bgcolor=#d6d6d6
| 191459 ||  || — || September 27, 2003 || Kitt Peak || Spacewatch || — || align=right | 6.3 km || 
|-id=460 bgcolor=#d6d6d6
| 191460 ||  || — || September 28, 2003 || Kitt Peak || Spacewatch || — || align=right | 4.3 km || 
|-id=461 bgcolor=#d6d6d6
| 191461 ||  || — || September 29, 2003 || Socorro || LINEAR || VER || align=right | 3.9 km || 
|-id=462 bgcolor=#E9E9E9
| 191462 ||  || — || September 29, 2003 || Socorro || LINEAR || AGN || align=right | 1.9 km || 
|-id=463 bgcolor=#d6d6d6
| 191463 ||  || — || September 29, 2003 || Socorro || LINEAR || — || align=right | 4.3 km || 
|-id=464 bgcolor=#d6d6d6
| 191464 ||  || — || September 26, 2003 || Goodricke-Pigott || R. A. Tucker || — || align=right | 5.1 km || 
|-id=465 bgcolor=#d6d6d6
| 191465 ||  || — || September 24, 2003 || Haleakala || NEAT || — || align=right | 3.9 km || 
|-id=466 bgcolor=#d6d6d6
| 191466 ||  || — || September 27, 2003 || Socorro || LINEAR || — || align=right | 5.2 km || 
|-id=467 bgcolor=#d6d6d6
| 191467 ||  || — || September 18, 2003 || Palomar || NEAT || URS || align=right | 6.1 km || 
|-id=468 bgcolor=#d6d6d6
| 191468 ||  || — || September 19, 2003 || Socorro || LINEAR || — || align=right | 4.3 km || 
|-id=469 bgcolor=#d6d6d6
| 191469 ||  || — || September 21, 2003 || Palomar || NEAT || — || align=right | 5.7 km || 
|-id=470 bgcolor=#d6d6d6
| 191470 ||  || — || September 21, 2003 || Palomar || NEAT || EUP || align=right | 6.3 km || 
|-id=471 bgcolor=#d6d6d6
| 191471 ||  || — || September 28, 2003 || Socorro || LINEAR || — || align=right | 4.1 km || 
|-id=472 bgcolor=#d6d6d6
| 191472 ||  || — || September 30, 2003 || Socorro || LINEAR || — || align=right | 4.8 km || 
|-id=473 bgcolor=#d6d6d6
| 191473 ||  || — || September 25, 2003 || Palomar || NEAT || EOS || align=right | 4.5 km || 
|-id=474 bgcolor=#d6d6d6
| 191474 ||  || — || September 25, 2003 || Palomar || NEAT || — || align=right | 3.0 km || 
|-id=475 bgcolor=#d6d6d6
| 191475 ||  || — || September 26, 2003 || Socorro || LINEAR || TIR || align=right | 3.5 km || 
|-id=476 bgcolor=#d6d6d6
| 191476 ||  || — || September 16, 2003 || Palomar || NEAT || FIR || align=right | 6.2 km || 
|-id=477 bgcolor=#d6d6d6
| 191477 ||  || — || September 18, 2003 || Haleakala || NEAT || — || align=right | 3.9 km || 
|-id=478 bgcolor=#d6d6d6
| 191478 ||  || — || September 17, 2003 || Palomar || NEAT || — || align=right | 5.3 km || 
|-id=479 bgcolor=#d6d6d6
| 191479 ||  || — || September 29, 2003 || Anderson Mesa || LONEOS || — || align=right | 7.0 km || 
|-id=480 bgcolor=#d6d6d6
| 191480 ||  || — || September 28, 2003 || Haleakala || NEAT || URS || align=right | 6.0 km || 
|-id=481 bgcolor=#d6d6d6
| 191481 ||  || — || September 26, 2003 || Goodricke-Pigott || R. A. Tucker || URS || align=right | 3.5 km || 
|-id=482 bgcolor=#d6d6d6
| 191482 ||  || — || September 27, 2003 || Goodricke-Pigott || R. A. Tucker || ANF || align=right | 3.5 km || 
|-id=483 bgcolor=#d6d6d6
| 191483 ||  || — || September 21, 2003 || Anderson Mesa || LONEOS || TIR || align=right | 5.4 km || 
|-id=484 bgcolor=#d6d6d6
| 191484 ||  || — || October 3, 2003 || Kingsnake || J. V. McClusky || — || align=right | 7.9 km || 
|-id=485 bgcolor=#d6d6d6
| 191485 ||  || — || October 7, 2003 || Wrightwood || J. W. Young || — || align=right | 3.5 km || 
|-id=486 bgcolor=#d6d6d6
| 191486 ||  || — || October 1, 2003 || Anderson Mesa || LONEOS || — || align=right | 5.4 km || 
|-id=487 bgcolor=#d6d6d6
| 191487 ||  || — || October 1, 2003 || Anderson Mesa || LONEOS || EOS || align=right | 3.6 km || 
|-id=488 bgcolor=#d6d6d6
| 191488 ||  || — || October 15, 2003 || Anderson Mesa || LONEOS || — || align=right | 6.6 km || 
|-id=489 bgcolor=#d6d6d6
| 191489 ||  || — || October 14, 2003 || Anderson Mesa || LONEOS || HYG || align=right | 6.2 km || 
|-id=490 bgcolor=#d6d6d6
| 191490 ||  || — || October 15, 2003 || Palomar || NEAT || — || align=right | 3.7 km || 
|-id=491 bgcolor=#d6d6d6
| 191491 ||  || — || October 15, 2003 || Anderson Mesa || LONEOS || — || align=right | 4.8 km || 
|-id=492 bgcolor=#d6d6d6
| 191492 ||  || — || October 5, 2003 || Socorro || LINEAR || — || align=right | 3.4 km || 
|-id=493 bgcolor=#d6d6d6
| 191493 ||  || — || October 14, 2003 || Palomar || NEAT || — || align=right | 4.1 km || 
|-id=494 bgcolor=#d6d6d6
| 191494 Berndkoch ||  ||  || October 16, 2003 || Mülheim-Ruhr || A. Martin || — || align=right | 4.1 km || 
|-id=495 bgcolor=#d6d6d6
| 191495 ||  || — || October 20, 2003 || Socorro || LINEAR || ALA || align=right | 5.4 km || 
|-id=496 bgcolor=#d6d6d6
| 191496 ||  || — || October 21, 2003 || Kingsnake || J. V. McClusky || — || align=right | 7.2 km || 
|-id=497 bgcolor=#d6d6d6
| 191497 ||  || — || October 23, 2003 || Goodricke-Pigott || R. A. Tucker || — || align=right | 6.4 km || 
|-id=498 bgcolor=#d6d6d6
| 191498 ||  || — || October 16, 2003 || Palomar || NEAT || — || align=right | 5.7 km || 
|-id=499 bgcolor=#d6d6d6
| 191499 ||  || — || October 16, 2003 || Anderson Mesa || LONEOS || EMA || align=right | 7.2 km || 
|-id=500 bgcolor=#d6d6d6
| 191500 ||  || — || October 24, 2003 || Haleakala || NEAT || — || align=right | 4.3 km || 
|}

191501–191600 

|-bgcolor=#d6d6d6
| 191501 ||  || — || October 16, 2003 || Kitt Peak || Spacewatch || — || align=right | 4.8 km || 
|-id=502 bgcolor=#d6d6d6
| 191502 ||  || — || October 16, 2003 || Anderson Mesa || LONEOS || HYG || align=right | 4.7 km || 
|-id=503 bgcolor=#d6d6d6
| 191503 ||  || — || October 16, 2003 || Anderson Mesa || LONEOS || HYG || align=right | 6.4 km || 
|-id=504 bgcolor=#d6d6d6
| 191504 ||  || — || October 18, 2003 || Palomar || NEAT || — || align=right | 5.3 km || 
|-id=505 bgcolor=#d6d6d6
| 191505 ||  || — || October 16, 2003 || Palomar || NEAT || HYG || align=right | 5.5 km || 
|-id=506 bgcolor=#d6d6d6
| 191506 ||  || — || October 16, 2003 || Anderson Mesa || LONEOS || EOS || align=right | 3.5 km || 
|-id=507 bgcolor=#d6d6d6
| 191507 ||  || — || October 16, 2003 || Palomar || NEAT || — || align=right | 3.1 km || 
|-id=508 bgcolor=#d6d6d6
| 191508 ||  || — || October 19, 2003 || Kitt Peak || Spacewatch || — || align=right | 4.1 km || 
|-id=509 bgcolor=#d6d6d6
| 191509 ||  || — || October 16, 2003 || Anderson Mesa || LONEOS || — || align=right | 6.0 km || 
|-id=510 bgcolor=#d6d6d6
| 191510 ||  || — || October 18, 2003 || Kitt Peak || Spacewatch || THM || align=right | 5.0 km || 
|-id=511 bgcolor=#d6d6d6
| 191511 ||  || — || October 18, 2003 || Palomar || NEAT || — || align=right | 6.9 km || 
|-id=512 bgcolor=#d6d6d6
| 191512 ||  || — || October 18, 2003 || Palomar || NEAT || — || align=right | 3.8 km || 
|-id=513 bgcolor=#d6d6d6
| 191513 ||  || — || October 20, 2003 || Kitt Peak || Spacewatch || — || align=right | 3.5 km || 
|-id=514 bgcolor=#d6d6d6
| 191514 ||  || — || October 20, 2003 || Palomar || NEAT || EOS || align=right | 3.8 km || 
|-id=515 bgcolor=#d6d6d6
| 191515 ||  || — || October 19, 2003 || Haleakala || NEAT || — || align=right | 5.0 km || 
|-id=516 bgcolor=#d6d6d6
| 191516 ||  || — || October 20, 2003 || Socorro || LINEAR || HYG || align=right | 4.2 km || 
|-id=517 bgcolor=#d6d6d6
| 191517 ||  || — || October 21, 2003 || Socorro || LINEAR || — || align=right | 4.7 km || 
|-id=518 bgcolor=#d6d6d6
| 191518 ||  || — || October 21, 2003 || Kitt Peak || Spacewatch || — || align=right | 3.9 km || 
|-id=519 bgcolor=#d6d6d6
| 191519 ||  || — || October 20, 2003 || Palomar || NEAT || — || align=right | 2.6 km || 
|-id=520 bgcolor=#d6d6d6
| 191520 ||  || — || October 19, 2003 || Kitt Peak || Spacewatch || — || align=right | 4.0 km || 
|-id=521 bgcolor=#d6d6d6
| 191521 ||  || — || October 21, 2003 || Kitt Peak || Spacewatch || — || align=right | 4.7 km || 
|-id=522 bgcolor=#d6d6d6
| 191522 ||  || — || October 20, 2003 || Kitt Peak || Spacewatch || THM || align=right | 3.6 km || 
|-id=523 bgcolor=#d6d6d6
| 191523 ||  || — || October 20, 2003 || Palomar || NEAT || VER || align=right | 6.8 km || 
|-id=524 bgcolor=#d6d6d6
| 191524 ||  || — || October 21, 2003 || Palomar || NEAT || — || align=right | 4.8 km || 
|-id=525 bgcolor=#d6d6d6
| 191525 ||  || — || October 21, 2003 || Palomar || NEAT || — || align=right | 3.8 km || 
|-id=526 bgcolor=#d6d6d6
| 191526 ||  || — || October 22, 2003 || Socorro || LINEAR || — || align=right | 5.1 km || 
|-id=527 bgcolor=#d6d6d6
| 191527 ||  || — || October 20, 2003 || Kitt Peak || Spacewatch || — || align=right | 3.5 km || 
|-id=528 bgcolor=#d6d6d6
| 191528 ||  || — || October 20, 2003 || Kitt Peak || Spacewatch || — || align=right | 4.3 km || 
|-id=529 bgcolor=#d6d6d6
| 191529 ||  || — || October 21, 2003 || Kitt Peak || Spacewatch || — || align=right | 3.9 km || 
|-id=530 bgcolor=#d6d6d6
| 191530 ||  || — || October 21, 2003 || Anderson Mesa || LONEOS || HYGfast || align=right | 5.0 km || 
|-id=531 bgcolor=#d6d6d6
| 191531 ||  || — || October 21, 2003 || Kitt Peak || Spacewatch || — || align=right | 4.5 km || 
|-id=532 bgcolor=#d6d6d6
| 191532 ||  || — || October 21, 2003 || Socorro || LINEAR || — || align=right | 3.2 km || 
|-id=533 bgcolor=#d6d6d6
| 191533 ||  || — || October 22, 2003 || Kitt Peak || Spacewatch || — || align=right | 5.9 km || 
|-id=534 bgcolor=#d6d6d6
| 191534 ||  || — || October 23, 2003 || Kitt Peak || Spacewatch || — || align=right | 7.0 km || 
|-id=535 bgcolor=#d6d6d6
| 191535 ||  || — || October 21, 2003 || Socorro || LINEAR || — || align=right | 4.2 km || 
|-id=536 bgcolor=#d6d6d6
| 191536 ||  || — || October 22, 2003 || Socorro || LINEAR || THB || align=right | 6.6 km || 
|-id=537 bgcolor=#d6d6d6
| 191537 ||  || — || October 22, 2003 || Socorro || LINEAR || — || align=right | 4.5 km || 
|-id=538 bgcolor=#d6d6d6
| 191538 ||  || — || October 23, 2003 || Kitt Peak || Spacewatch || HYG || align=right | 4.9 km || 
|-id=539 bgcolor=#d6d6d6
| 191539 ||  || — || October 23, 2003 || Kitt Peak || Spacewatch || VER || align=right | 4.1 km || 
|-id=540 bgcolor=#d6d6d6
| 191540 ||  || — || October 22, 2003 || Kitt Peak || Spacewatch || HYG || align=right | 5.8 km || 
|-id=541 bgcolor=#d6d6d6
| 191541 ||  || — || October 23, 2003 || Haleakala || NEAT || — || align=right | 8.3 km || 
|-id=542 bgcolor=#d6d6d6
| 191542 ||  || — || October 24, 2003 || Kitt Peak || Spacewatch || — || align=right | 7.6 km || 
|-id=543 bgcolor=#d6d6d6
| 191543 ||  || — || October 25, 2003 || Socorro || LINEAR || HYG || align=right | 4.1 km || 
|-id=544 bgcolor=#d6d6d6
| 191544 ||  || — || October 25, 2003 || Kitt Peak || Spacewatch || THM || align=right | 3.5 km || 
|-id=545 bgcolor=#d6d6d6
| 191545 ||  || — || October 26, 2003 || Socorro || LINEAR || — || align=right | 5.8 km || 
|-id=546 bgcolor=#d6d6d6
| 191546 ||  || — || October 28, 2003 || Socorro || LINEAR || — || align=right | 3.7 km || 
|-id=547 bgcolor=#d6d6d6
| 191547 ||  || — || October 28, 2003 || Haleakala || NEAT || — || align=right | 7.0 km || 
|-id=548 bgcolor=#d6d6d6
| 191548 ||  || — || October 25, 2003 || Socorro || LINEAR || — || align=right | 6.0 km || 
|-id=549 bgcolor=#d6d6d6
| 191549 ||  || — || October 18, 2003 || Socorro || LINEAR || URS || align=right | 3.4 km || 
|-id=550 bgcolor=#d6d6d6
| 191550 ||  || — || October 16, 2003 || Kitt Peak || Spacewatch || — || align=right | 2.7 km || 
|-id=551 bgcolor=#d6d6d6
| 191551 ||  || — || November 6, 2003 || Piszkéstető || K. Sárneczky, B. Sipőcz || — || align=right | 4.7 km || 
|-id=552 bgcolor=#E9E9E9
| 191552 ||  || — || November 14, 2003 || Palomar || NEAT || AGN || align=right | 1.8 km || 
|-id=553 bgcolor=#d6d6d6
| 191553 ||  || — || November 16, 2003 || Kitt Peak || Spacewatch || — || align=right | 4.3 km || 
|-id=554 bgcolor=#d6d6d6
| 191554 ||  || — || November 16, 2003 || Kitt Peak || Spacewatch || — || align=right | 4.6 km || 
|-id=555 bgcolor=#E9E9E9
| 191555 ||  || — || November 19, 2003 || Socorro || LINEAR || — || align=right | 4.4 km || 
|-id=556 bgcolor=#d6d6d6
| 191556 ||  || — || November 19, 2003 || Palomar || NEAT || EOS || align=right | 3.8 km || 
|-id=557 bgcolor=#d6d6d6
| 191557 ||  || — || November 19, 2003 || Kitt Peak || Spacewatch || — || align=right | 3.5 km || 
|-id=558 bgcolor=#d6d6d6
| 191558 ||  || — || November 19, 2003 || Kitt Peak || Spacewatch || — || align=right | 8.2 km || 
|-id=559 bgcolor=#d6d6d6
| 191559 ||  || — || November 19, 2003 || Kitt Peak || Spacewatch || — || align=right | 6.1 km || 
|-id=560 bgcolor=#d6d6d6
| 191560 ||  || — || November 19, 2003 || Kitt Peak || Spacewatch || THM || align=right | 3.8 km || 
|-id=561 bgcolor=#d6d6d6
| 191561 ||  || — || November 20, 2003 || Socorro || LINEAR || — || align=right | 5.1 km || 
|-id=562 bgcolor=#d6d6d6
| 191562 ||  || — || November 20, 2003 || Socorro || LINEAR || — || align=right | 6.2 km || 
|-id=563 bgcolor=#d6d6d6
| 191563 ||  || — || November 21, 2003 || Palomar || NEAT || — || align=right | 5.5 km || 
|-id=564 bgcolor=#d6d6d6
| 191564 ||  || — || November 20, 2003 || Socorro || LINEAR || HYG || align=right | 4.7 km || 
|-id=565 bgcolor=#d6d6d6
| 191565 ||  || — || November 21, 2003 || Palomar || NEAT || — || align=right | 5.3 km || 
|-id=566 bgcolor=#fefefe
| 191566 ||  || — || November 21, 2003 || Socorro || LINEAR || H || align=right | 1.1 km || 
|-id=567 bgcolor=#E9E9E9
| 191567 ||  || — || November 23, 2003 || Socorro || LINEAR || — || align=right | 1.3 km || 
|-id=568 bgcolor=#d6d6d6
| 191568 ||  || — || November 26, 2003 || Socorro || LINEAR || THM || align=right | 3.4 km || 
|-id=569 bgcolor=#fefefe
| 191569 ||  || — || November 29, 2003 || Socorro || LINEAR || H || align=right data-sort-value="0.91" | 910 m || 
|-id=570 bgcolor=#d6d6d6
| 191570 ||  || — || November 30, 2003 || Socorro || LINEAR || — || align=right | 4.1 km || 
|-id=571 bgcolor=#d6d6d6
| 191571 ||  || — || November 21, 2003 || Catalina || CSS || — || align=right | 6.8 km || 
|-id=572 bgcolor=#d6d6d6
| 191572 ||  || — || November 22, 2003 || Catalina || CSS || ALA || align=right | 6.9 km || 
|-id=573 bgcolor=#d6d6d6
| 191573 ||  || — || December 10, 2003 || Palomar || NEAT || — || align=right | 6.2 km || 
|-id=574 bgcolor=#fefefe
| 191574 ||  || — || December 15, 2003 || Socorro || LINEAR || H || align=right | 1.2 km || 
|-id=575 bgcolor=#E9E9E9
| 191575 ||  || — || December 1, 2003 || Socorro || LINEAR || — || align=right | 2.4 km || 
|-id=576 bgcolor=#d6d6d6
| 191576 ||  || — || December 1, 2003 || Kitt Peak || Spacewatch || — || align=right | 4.1 km || 
|-id=577 bgcolor=#d6d6d6
| 191577 ||  || — || December 1, 2003 || Kitt Peak || Spacewatch || THM || align=right | 4.1 km || 
|-id=578 bgcolor=#d6d6d6
| 191578 ||  || — || December 3, 2003 || Socorro || LINEAR || EOS || align=right | 3.7 km || 
|-id=579 bgcolor=#d6d6d6
| 191579 ||  || — || December 17, 2003 || Socorro || LINEAR || — || align=right | 6.5 km || 
|-id=580 bgcolor=#d6d6d6
| 191580 ||  || — || December 19, 2003 || Socorro || LINEAR || — || align=right | 4.4 km || 
|-id=581 bgcolor=#d6d6d6
| 191581 ||  || — || December 19, 2003 || Socorro || LINEAR || THM || align=right | 3.2 km || 
|-id=582 bgcolor=#d6d6d6
| 191582 Kikadolfi ||  ||  || December 20, 2003 || San Marcello || L. Tesi, G. Fagioli || — || align=right | 3.8 km || 
|-id=583 bgcolor=#d6d6d6
| 191583 ||  || — || December 22, 2003 || Socorro || LINEAR || — || align=right | 7.6 km || 
|-id=584 bgcolor=#d6d6d6
| 191584 ||  || — || January 19, 2004 || Kitt Peak || Spacewatch || — || align=right | 3.3 km || 
|-id=585 bgcolor=#d6d6d6
| 191585 ||  || — || February 12, 2004 || Palomar || NEAT || EOS || align=right | 3.4 km || 
|-id=586 bgcolor=#fefefe
| 191586 ||  || — || February 22, 2004 || Socorro || LINEAR || H || align=right | 1.0 km || 
|-id=587 bgcolor=#fefefe
| 191587 ||  || — || March 12, 2004 || Palomar || NEAT || — || align=right data-sort-value="0.84" | 840 m || 
|-id=588 bgcolor=#fefefe
| 191588 ||  || — || March 15, 2004 || Catalina || CSS || — || align=right | 1.1 km || 
|-id=589 bgcolor=#FA8072
| 191589 ||  || — || March 19, 2004 || Palomar || NEAT || — || align=right | 1.9 km || 
|-id=590 bgcolor=#fefefe
| 191590 ||  || — || March 24, 2004 || Bergisch Gladbach || W. Bickel || FLO || align=right data-sort-value="0.84" | 840 m || 
|-id=591 bgcolor=#fefefe
| 191591 ||  || — || March 17, 2004 || Socorro || LINEAR || — || align=right | 1.1 km || 
|-id=592 bgcolor=#fefefe
| 191592 ||  || — || March 17, 2004 || Socorro || LINEAR || — || align=right | 1.2 km || 
|-id=593 bgcolor=#fefefe
| 191593 ||  || — || March 20, 2004 || Socorro || LINEAR || — || align=right | 1.6 km || 
|-id=594 bgcolor=#fefefe
| 191594 ||  || — || March 20, 2004 || Socorro || LINEAR || FLO || align=right data-sort-value="0.92" | 920 m || 
|-id=595 bgcolor=#fefefe
| 191595 ||  || — || March 24, 2004 || Anderson Mesa || LONEOS || FLO || align=right data-sort-value="0.99" | 990 m || 
|-id=596 bgcolor=#fefefe
| 191596 ||  || — || March 24, 2004 || Anderson Mesa || LONEOS || FLO || align=right data-sort-value="0.74" | 740 m || 
|-id=597 bgcolor=#fefefe
| 191597 ||  || — || March 27, 2004 || Socorro || LINEAR || — || align=right data-sort-value="0.98" | 980 m || 
|-id=598 bgcolor=#fefefe
| 191598 ||  || — || March 27, 2004 || Socorro || LINEAR || V || align=right | 1.0 km || 
|-id=599 bgcolor=#fefefe
| 191599 ||  || — || March 28, 2004 || Socorro || LINEAR || PHO || align=right | 1.6 km || 
|-id=600 bgcolor=#FA8072
| 191600 ||  || — || March 22, 2004 || Socorro || LINEAR || — || align=right | 1.5 km || 
|}

191601–191700 

|-bgcolor=#fefefe
| 191601 ||  || — || April 13, 2004 || Catalina || CSS || V || align=right | 1.1 km || 
|-id=602 bgcolor=#fefefe
| 191602 ||  || — || April 12, 2004 || Kitt Peak || Spacewatch || — || align=right data-sort-value="0.70" | 700 m || 
|-id=603 bgcolor=#fefefe
| 191603 ||  || — || April 14, 2004 || Anderson Mesa || LONEOS || FLO || align=right | 1.0 km || 
|-id=604 bgcolor=#fefefe
| 191604 ||  || — || April 12, 2004 || Kitt Peak || Spacewatch || — || align=right data-sort-value="0.95" | 950 m || 
|-id=605 bgcolor=#fefefe
| 191605 ||  || — || April 12, 2004 || Palomar || NEAT || FLO || align=right data-sort-value="0.94" | 940 m || 
|-id=606 bgcolor=#fefefe
| 191606 ||  || — || April 15, 2004 || Palomar || NEAT || FLO || align=right | 1.1 km || 
|-id=607 bgcolor=#fefefe
| 191607 ||  || — || April 16, 2004 || Palomar || NEAT || — || align=right | 1.2 km || 
|-id=608 bgcolor=#fefefe
| 191608 ||  || — || April 17, 2004 || Socorro || LINEAR || — || align=right | 1.8 km || 
|-id=609 bgcolor=#fefefe
| 191609 ||  || — || April 17, 2004 || Socorro || LINEAR || — || align=right | 1.3 km || 
|-id=610 bgcolor=#fefefe
| 191610 ||  || — || April 19, 2004 || Socorro || LINEAR || — || align=right | 1.0 km || 
|-id=611 bgcolor=#fefefe
| 191611 ||  || — || April 21, 2004 || Socorro || LINEAR || — || align=right | 1.5 km || 
|-id=612 bgcolor=#fefefe
| 191612 ||  || — || April 22, 2004 || Siding Spring || SSS || — || align=right | 1.0 km || 
|-id=613 bgcolor=#fefefe
| 191613 ||  || — || April 23, 2004 || Kitt Peak || Spacewatch || — || align=right | 1.2 km || 
|-id=614 bgcolor=#fefefe
| 191614 ||  || — || May 8, 2004 || Palomar || NEAT || — || align=right | 1.1 km || 
|-id=615 bgcolor=#fefefe
| 191615 ||  || — || May 8, 2004 || Palomar || NEAT || — || align=right | 1.3 km || 
|-id=616 bgcolor=#fefefe
| 191616 ||  || — || May 9, 2004 || Palomar || NEAT || V || align=right data-sort-value="0.85" | 850 m || 
|-id=617 bgcolor=#fefefe
| 191617 ||  || — || May 15, 2004 || Socorro || LINEAR || — || align=right data-sort-value="0.99" | 990 m || 
|-id=618 bgcolor=#fefefe
| 191618 ||  || — || May 15, 2004 || Socorro || LINEAR || NYS || align=right data-sort-value="0.86" | 860 m || 
|-id=619 bgcolor=#fefefe
| 191619 ||  || — || May 19, 2004 || Socorro || LINEAR || NYS || align=right data-sort-value="0.91" | 910 m || 
|-id=620 bgcolor=#fefefe
| 191620 ||  || — || June 12, 2004 || Palomar || NEAT || — || align=right | 1.8 km || 
|-id=621 bgcolor=#fefefe
| 191621 ||  || — || June 19, 2004 || Wrightwood || J. W. Young || MAS || align=right data-sort-value="0.96" | 960 m || 
|-id=622 bgcolor=#fefefe
| 191622 ||  || — || June 27, 2004 || Siding Spring || SSS || MAS || align=right | 1.1 km || 
|-id=623 bgcolor=#fefefe
| 191623 ||  || — || July 7, 2004 || Campo Imperatore || CINEOS || V || align=right | 1.1 km || 
|-id=624 bgcolor=#fefefe
| 191624 ||  || — || July 9, 2004 || Palomar || NEAT || — || align=right | 1.9 km || 
|-id=625 bgcolor=#fefefe
| 191625 ||  || — || July 12, 2004 || Reedy Creek || J. Broughton || — || align=right | 1.1 km || 
|-id=626 bgcolor=#fefefe
| 191626 ||  || — || July 11, 2004 || Socorro || LINEAR || — || align=right | 1.5 km || 
|-id=627 bgcolor=#fefefe
| 191627 ||  || — || July 11, 2004 || Socorro || LINEAR || NYS || align=right | 1.2 km || 
|-id=628 bgcolor=#fefefe
| 191628 ||  || — || July 11, 2004 || Socorro || LINEAR || NYS || align=right data-sort-value="0.93" | 930 m || 
|-id=629 bgcolor=#E9E9E9
| 191629 ||  || — || July 11, 2004 || Socorro || LINEAR || — || align=right | 1.5 km || 
|-id=630 bgcolor=#fefefe
| 191630 ||  || — || July 11, 2004 || Socorro || LINEAR || — || align=right | 1.3 km || 
|-id=631 bgcolor=#fefefe
| 191631 ||  || — || July 11, 2004 || Socorro || LINEAR || V || align=right | 1.3 km || 
|-id=632 bgcolor=#fefefe
| 191632 ||  || — || July 11, 2004 || Socorro || LINEAR || — || align=right data-sort-value="0.93" | 930 m || 
|-id=633 bgcolor=#fefefe
| 191633 ||  || — || July 17, 2004 || Reedy Creek || J. Broughton || — || align=right | 1.2 km || 
|-id=634 bgcolor=#fefefe
| 191634 ||  || — || August 3, 2004 || Siding Spring || SSS || — || align=right | 1.3 km || 
|-id=635 bgcolor=#fefefe
| 191635 ||  || — || August 6, 2004 || Palomar || NEAT || V || align=right | 1.3 km || 
|-id=636 bgcolor=#E9E9E9
| 191636 ||  || — || August 6, 2004 || Palomar || NEAT || — || align=right | 1.4 km || 
|-id=637 bgcolor=#fefefe
| 191637 ||  || — || August 8, 2004 || Anderson Mesa || LONEOS || — || align=right | 1.8 km || 
|-id=638 bgcolor=#fefefe
| 191638 ||  || — || August 6, 2004 || Palomar || NEAT || — || align=right | 1.3 km || 
|-id=639 bgcolor=#fefefe
| 191639 ||  || — || August 8, 2004 || Socorro || LINEAR || — || align=right | 1.4 km || 
|-id=640 bgcolor=#fefefe
| 191640 ||  || — || August 8, 2004 || Socorro || LINEAR || — || align=right | 1.3 km || 
|-id=641 bgcolor=#E9E9E9
| 191641 ||  || — || August 8, 2004 || Socorro || LINEAR || — || align=right | 1.3 km || 
|-id=642 bgcolor=#E9E9E9
| 191642 ||  || — || August 7, 2004 || Palomar || NEAT || — || align=right | 1.5 km || 
|-id=643 bgcolor=#fefefe
| 191643 ||  || — || August 8, 2004 || Anderson Mesa || LONEOS || MAS || align=right | 1.0 km || 
|-id=644 bgcolor=#fefefe
| 191644 ||  || — || August 9, 2004 || Socorro || LINEAR || — || align=right | 1.3 km || 
|-id=645 bgcolor=#fefefe
| 191645 ||  || — || August 9, 2004 || Socorro || LINEAR || MAS || align=right | 1.1 km || 
|-id=646 bgcolor=#fefefe
| 191646 ||  || — || August 9, 2004 || Socorro || LINEAR || V || align=right | 1.1 km || 
|-id=647 bgcolor=#fefefe
| 191647 ||  || — || August 6, 2004 || Palomar || NEAT || V || align=right | 1.1 km || 
|-id=648 bgcolor=#E9E9E9
| 191648 ||  || — || August 7, 2004 || Palomar || NEAT || — || align=right | 1.6 km || 
|-id=649 bgcolor=#E9E9E9
| 191649 ||  || — || August 8, 2004 || Campo Imperatore || CINEOS || — || align=right | 1.6 km || 
|-id=650 bgcolor=#fefefe
| 191650 ||  || — || August 8, 2004 || Socorro || LINEAR || — || align=right | 1.5 km || 
|-id=651 bgcolor=#fefefe
| 191651 ||  || — || August 9, 2004 || Socorro || LINEAR || V || align=right | 1.1 km || 
|-id=652 bgcolor=#fefefe
| 191652 ||  || — || August 9, 2004 || Socorro || LINEAR || V || align=right | 1.0 km || 
|-id=653 bgcolor=#E9E9E9
| 191653 ||  || — || August 7, 2004 || Palomar || NEAT || — || align=right | 1.6 km || 
|-id=654 bgcolor=#E9E9E9
| 191654 ||  || — || August 8, 2004 || Socorro || LINEAR || — || align=right | 1.5 km || 
|-id=655 bgcolor=#fefefe
| 191655 ||  || — || August 8, 2004 || Socorro || LINEAR || NYS || align=right | 1.1 km || 
|-id=656 bgcolor=#E9E9E9
| 191656 ||  || — || August 10, 2004 || Socorro || LINEAR || — || align=right | 1.2 km || 
|-id=657 bgcolor=#E9E9E9
| 191657 ||  || — || August 10, 2004 || Socorro || LINEAR || — || align=right | 2.0 km || 
|-id=658 bgcolor=#E9E9E9
| 191658 ||  || — || August 11, 2004 || Socorro || LINEAR || — || align=right | 2.4 km || 
|-id=659 bgcolor=#E9E9E9
| 191659 ||  || — || August 11, 2004 || Socorro || LINEAR || — || align=right | 2.6 km || 
|-id=660 bgcolor=#E9E9E9
| 191660 ||  || — || August 11, 2004 || Socorro || LINEAR || — || align=right | 1.5 km || 
|-id=661 bgcolor=#E9E9E9
| 191661 ||  || — || August 11, 2004 || Socorro || LINEAR || — || align=right | 3.4 km || 
|-id=662 bgcolor=#E9E9E9
| 191662 ||  || — || August 12, 2004 || Socorro || LINEAR || — || align=right | 3.3 km || 
|-id=663 bgcolor=#E9E9E9
| 191663 ||  || — || August 12, 2004 || Socorro || LINEAR || — || align=right | 2.5 km || 
|-id=664 bgcolor=#E9E9E9
| 191664 ||  || — || August 12, 2004 || Socorro || LINEAR || — || align=right | 4.5 km || 
|-id=665 bgcolor=#E9E9E9
| 191665 ||  || — || August 12, 2004 || Socorro || LINEAR || — || align=right | 2.7 km || 
|-id=666 bgcolor=#fefefe
| 191666 ||  || — || August 3, 2004 || Siding Spring || SSS || — || align=right | 2.9 km || 
|-id=667 bgcolor=#E9E9E9
| 191667 || 2004 QZ || — || August 16, 2004 || Palomar || NEAT || — || align=right | 2.4 km || 
|-id=668 bgcolor=#E9E9E9
| 191668 ||  || — || August 19, 2004 || Siding Spring || SSS || — || align=right | 1.5 km || 
|-id=669 bgcolor=#E9E9E9
| 191669 ||  || — || August 21, 2004 || Siding Spring || SSS || — || align=right | 1.5 km || 
|-id=670 bgcolor=#E9E9E9
| 191670 ||  || — || August 21, 2004 || Siding Spring || SSS || KON || align=right | 3.4 km || 
|-id=671 bgcolor=#E9E9E9
| 191671 ||  || — || August 25, 2004 || Wise || Wise Obs. || GEF || align=right | 2.3 km || 
|-id=672 bgcolor=#fefefe
| 191672 ||  || — || September 7, 2004 || Vicques || M. Ory || NYS || align=right data-sort-value="0.88" | 880 m || 
|-id=673 bgcolor=#fefefe
| 191673 ||  || — || September 7, 2004 || Palomar || NEAT || — || align=right | 1.5 km || 
|-id=674 bgcolor=#E9E9E9
| 191674 ||  || — || September 7, 2004 || Socorro || LINEAR || — || align=right | 1.7 km || 
|-id=675 bgcolor=#E9E9E9
| 191675 ||  || — || September 7, 2004 || Kitt Peak || Spacewatch || — || align=right | 1.0 km || 
|-id=676 bgcolor=#E9E9E9
| 191676 ||  || — || September 8, 2004 || Socorro || LINEAR || — || align=right | 1.5 km || 
|-id=677 bgcolor=#E9E9E9
| 191677 ||  || — || September 8, 2004 || Socorro || LINEAR || — || align=right | 1.1 km || 
|-id=678 bgcolor=#E9E9E9
| 191678 ||  || — || September 8, 2004 || Socorro || LINEAR || — || align=right | 1.1 km || 
|-id=679 bgcolor=#E9E9E9
| 191679 ||  || — || September 8, 2004 || Socorro || LINEAR || — || align=right | 1.2 km || 
|-id=680 bgcolor=#E9E9E9
| 191680 ||  || — || September 8, 2004 || Socorro || LINEAR || — || align=right | 1.7 km || 
|-id=681 bgcolor=#E9E9E9
| 191681 ||  || — || September 8, 2004 || Socorro || LINEAR || RAF || align=right | 1.4 km || 
|-id=682 bgcolor=#E9E9E9
| 191682 ||  || — || September 8, 2004 || Socorro || LINEAR || — || align=right | 2.0 km || 
|-id=683 bgcolor=#fefefe
| 191683 ||  || — || September 8, 2004 || Socorro || LINEAR || — || align=right | 3.3 km || 
|-id=684 bgcolor=#E9E9E9
| 191684 ||  || — || September 8, 2004 || Socorro || LINEAR || — || align=right | 1.5 km || 
|-id=685 bgcolor=#E9E9E9
| 191685 ||  || — || September 8, 2004 || Palomar || NEAT || — || align=right | 2.8 km || 
|-id=686 bgcolor=#fefefe
| 191686 ||  || — || September 7, 2004 || Socorro || LINEAR || KLI || align=right | 3.8 km || 
|-id=687 bgcolor=#E9E9E9
| 191687 ||  || — || September 8, 2004 || Socorro || LINEAR || — || align=right | 1.4 km || 
|-id=688 bgcolor=#E9E9E9
| 191688 ||  || — || September 9, 2004 || Socorro || LINEAR || — || align=right | 1.2 km || 
|-id=689 bgcolor=#E9E9E9
| 191689 ||  || — || September 8, 2004 || Campo Imperatore || CINEOS || — || align=right | 1.8 km || 
|-id=690 bgcolor=#E9E9E9
| 191690 ||  || — || September 8, 2004 || Palomar || NEAT || — || align=right | 2.1 km || 
|-id=691 bgcolor=#E9E9E9
| 191691 ||  || — || September 8, 2004 || Palomar || NEAT || — || align=right | 2.5 km || 
|-id=692 bgcolor=#E9E9E9
| 191692 ||  || — || September 9, 2004 || Socorro || LINEAR || — || align=right | 1.7 km || 
|-id=693 bgcolor=#E9E9E9
| 191693 ||  || — || September 9, 2004 || Socorro || LINEAR || — || align=right | 1.5 km || 
|-id=694 bgcolor=#E9E9E9
| 191694 ||  || — || September 9, 2004 || Socorro || LINEAR || — || align=right | 1.5 km || 
|-id=695 bgcolor=#E9E9E9
| 191695 ||  || — || September 10, 2004 || Socorro || LINEAR || — || align=right | 1.8 km || 
|-id=696 bgcolor=#E9E9E9
| 191696 ||  || — || September 10, 2004 || Socorro || LINEAR || AER || align=right | 2.2 km || 
|-id=697 bgcolor=#E9E9E9
| 191697 ||  || — || September 11, 2004 || Socorro || LINEAR || — || align=right | 4.5 km || 
|-id=698 bgcolor=#E9E9E9
| 191698 ||  || — || September 10, 2004 || Socorro || LINEAR || — || align=right | 1.7 km || 
|-id=699 bgcolor=#E9E9E9
| 191699 ||  || — || September 7, 2004 || Kitt Peak || Spacewatch || EUN || align=right | 1.5 km || 
|-id=700 bgcolor=#fefefe
| 191700 ||  || — || September 8, 2004 || Socorro || LINEAR || — || align=right | 1.5 km || 
|}

191701–191800 

|-bgcolor=#E9E9E9
| 191701 ||  || — || September 8, 2004 || Socorro || LINEAR || — || align=right | 1.3 km || 
|-id=702 bgcolor=#E9E9E9
| 191702 ||  || — || September 8, 2004 || Palomar || NEAT || — || align=right | 3.2 km || 
|-id=703 bgcolor=#E9E9E9
| 191703 ||  || — || September 9, 2004 || Socorro || LINEAR || — || align=right | 1.4 km || 
|-id=704 bgcolor=#E9E9E9
| 191704 ||  || — || September 9, 2004 || Socorro || LINEAR || — || align=right | 2.1 km || 
|-id=705 bgcolor=#E9E9E9
| 191705 ||  || — || September 10, 2004 || Socorro || LINEAR || — || align=right | 2.0 km || 
|-id=706 bgcolor=#fefefe
| 191706 ||  || — || September 10, 2004 || Socorro || LINEAR || — || align=right | 1.8 km || 
|-id=707 bgcolor=#E9E9E9
| 191707 ||  || — || September 10, 2004 || Socorro || LINEAR || ADE || align=right | 2.4 km || 
|-id=708 bgcolor=#E9E9E9
| 191708 ||  || — || September 10, 2004 || Socorro || LINEAR || — || align=right | 2.7 km || 
|-id=709 bgcolor=#E9E9E9
| 191709 ||  || — || September 10, 2004 || Socorro || LINEAR || — || align=right | 1.6 km || 
|-id=710 bgcolor=#E9E9E9
| 191710 ||  || — || September 10, 2004 || Socorro || LINEAR || — || align=right | 2.7 km || 
|-id=711 bgcolor=#E9E9E9
| 191711 ||  || — || September 10, 2004 || Socorro || LINEAR || — || align=right | 2.7 km || 
|-id=712 bgcolor=#E9E9E9
| 191712 ||  || — || September 10, 2004 || Socorro || LINEAR || — || align=right | 1.7 km || 
|-id=713 bgcolor=#E9E9E9
| 191713 ||  || — || September 10, 2004 || Socorro || LINEAR || — || align=right | 4.5 km || 
|-id=714 bgcolor=#E9E9E9
| 191714 ||  || — || September 10, 2004 || Socorro || LINEAR || — || align=right | 4.0 km || 
|-id=715 bgcolor=#E9E9E9
| 191715 ||  || — || September 10, 2004 || Socorro || LINEAR || ADE || align=right | 3.8 km || 
|-id=716 bgcolor=#fefefe
| 191716 ||  || — || September 11, 2004 || Socorro || LINEAR || — || align=right | 2.0 km || 
|-id=717 bgcolor=#E9E9E9
| 191717 ||  || — || September 11, 2004 || Socorro || LINEAR || EUN || align=right | 1.8 km || 
|-id=718 bgcolor=#E9E9E9
| 191718 ||  || — || September 11, 2004 || Socorro || LINEAR || EUN || align=right | 2.0 km || 
|-id=719 bgcolor=#E9E9E9
| 191719 ||  || — || September 11, 2004 || Socorro || LINEAR || — || align=right | 2.5 km || 
|-id=720 bgcolor=#E9E9E9
| 191720 ||  || — || September 8, 2004 || Socorro || LINEAR || — || align=right | 3.7 km || 
|-id=721 bgcolor=#d6d6d6
| 191721 ||  || — || September 9, 2004 || Kitt Peak || Spacewatch || — || align=right | 3.4 km || 
|-id=722 bgcolor=#E9E9E9
| 191722 ||  || — || September 9, 2004 || Kitt Peak || Spacewatch || — || align=right | 1.2 km || 
|-id=723 bgcolor=#E9E9E9
| 191723 ||  || — || September 10, 2004 || Kitt Peak || Spacewatch || — || align=right | 1.9 km || 
|-id=724 bgcolor=#E9E9E9
| 191724 ||  || — || September 10, 2004 || Kitt Peak || Spacewatch || — || align=right | 1.3 km || 
|-id=725 bgcolor=#fefefe
| 191725 ||  || — || September 13, 2004 || Kitt Peak || Spacewatch || — || align=right | 1.5 km || 
|-id=726 bgcolor=#E9E9E9
| 191726 ||  || — || September 15, 2004 || 7300 Observatory || W. K. Y. Yeung || — || align=right | 1.8 km || 
|-id=727 bgcolor=#E9E9E9
| 191727 ||  || — || September 11, 2004 || Socorro || LINEAR || — || align=right | 1.8 km || 
|-id=728 bgcolor=#E9E9E9
| 191728 ||  || — || September 12, 2004 || Socorro || LINEAR || — || align=right | 1.3 km || 
|-id=729 bgcolor=#E9E9E9
| 191729 ||  || — || September 12, 2004 || Socorro || LINEAR || JUN || align=right | 1.6 km || 
|-id=730 bgcolor=#E9E9E9
| 191730 ||  || — || September 13, 2004 || Socorro || LINEAR || — || align=right | 1.7 km || 
|-id=731 bgcolor=#E9E9E9
| 191731 ||  || — || September 13, 2004 || Socorro || LINEAR || — || align=right | 1.6 km || 
|-id=732 bgcolor=#E9E9E9
| 191732 ||  || — || September 13, 2004 || Socorro || LINEAR || MRX || align=right | 2.0 km || 
|-id=733 bgcolor=#E9E9E9
| 191733 ||  || — || September 15, 2004 || Kitt Peak || Spacewatch || — || align=right | 1.5 km || 
|-id=734 bgcolor=#E9E9E9
| 191734 ||  || — || September 13, 2004 || Socorro || LINEAR || — || align=right | 4.1 km || 
|-id=735 bgcolor=#E9E9E9
| 191735 ||  || — || September 13, 2004 || Socorro || LINEAR || — || align=right | 4.3 km || 
|-id=736 bgcolor=#E9E9E9
| 191736 ||  || — || September 13, 2004 || Socorro || LINEAR || — || align=right | 2.7 km || 
|-id=737 bgcolor=#E9E9E9
| 191737 ||  || — || September 13, 2004 || Socorro || LINEAR || — || align=right | 2.9 km || 
|-id=738 bgcolor=#E9E9E9
| 191738 ||  || — || September 15, 2004 || Anderson Mesa || LONEOS || — || align=right | 2.1 km || 
|-id=739 bgcolor=#E9E9E9
| 191739 ||  || — || September 15, 2004 || Kitt Peak || Spacewatch || — || align=right | 1.9 km || 
|-id=740 bgcolor=#E9E9E9
| 191740 ||  || — || September 16, 2004 || Siding Spring || SSS || — || align=right | 2.3 km || 
|-id=741 bgcolor=#E9E9E9
| 191741 ||  || — || September 16, 2004 || Siding Spring || SSS || — || align=right | 2.7 km || 
|-id=742 bgcolor=#d6d6d6
| 191742 ||  || — || September 17, 2004 || Anderson Mesa || LONEOS || EOS || align=right | 3.0 km || 
|-id=743 bgcolor=#E9E9E9
| 191743 ||  || — || September 17, 2004 || Socorro || LINEAR || JUN || align=right | 4.1 km || 
|-id=744 bgcolor=#E9E9E9
| 191744 ||  || — || September 17, 2004 || Anderson Mesa || LONEOS || — || align=right | 1.7 km || 
|-id=745 bgcolor=#E9E9E9
| 191745 ||  || — || September 17, 2004 || Desert Eagle || W. K. Y. Yeung || — || align=right | 1.5 km || 
|-id=746 bgcolor=#E9E9E9
| 191746 ||  || — || September 17, 2004 || Socorro || LINEAR || EUN || align=right | 2.8 km || 
|-id=747 bgcolor=#E9E9E9
| 191747 ||  || — || September 17, 2004 || Socorro || LINEAR || — || align=right | 2.0 km || 
|-id=748 bgcolor=#E9E9E9
| 191748 ||  || — || September 17, 2004 || Socorro || LINEAR || — || align=right | 2.2 km || 
|-id=749 bgcolor=#E9E9E9
| 191749 ||  || — || September 18, 2004 || Socorro || LINEAR || — || align=right | 2.2 km || 
|-id=750 bgcolor=#E9E9E9
| 191750 ||  || — || September 21, 2004 || Socorro || LINEAR || EUN || align=right | 2.1 km || 
|-id=751 bgcolor=#fefefe
| 191751 ||  || — || September 22, 2004 || Socorro || LINEAR || NYS || align=right | 2.4 km || 
|-id=752 bgcolor=#fefefe
| 191752 ||  || — || September 22, 2004 || Socorro || LINEAR || MAS || align=right | 1.0 km || 
|-id=753 bgcolor=#E9E9E9
| 191753 ||  || — || September 22, 2004 || Kitt Peak || Spacewatch || — || align=right | 1.7 km || 
|-id=754 bgcolor=#E9E9E9
| 191754 ||  || — || September 17, 2004 || Socorro || LINEAR || ADE || align=right | 4.2 km || 
|-id=755 bgcolor=#E9E9E9
| 191755 ||  || — || September 22, 2004 || Socorro || LINEAR || — || align=right | 4.3 km || 
|-id=756 bgcolor=#E9E9E9
| 191756 ||  || — || September 22, 2004 || Socorro || LINEAR || — || align=right | 1.5 km || 
|-id=757 bgcolor=#d6d6d6
| 191757 ||  || — || September 16, 2004 || Kitt Peak || Spacewatch || EOS || align=right | 3.5 km || 
|-id=758 bgcolor=#E9E9E9
| 191758 ||  || — || October 3, 2004 || Palomar || NEAT || — || align=right | 2.2 km || 
|-id=759 bgcolor=#FA8072
| 191759 ||  || — || October 6, 2004 || Goodricke-Pigott || R. A. Tucker || — || align=right | 1.8 km || 
|-id=760 bgcolor=#E9E9E9
| 191760 ||  || — || October 7, 2004 || Goodricke-Pigott || R. A. Tucker || — || align=right | 1.3 km || 
|-id=761 bgcolor=#E9E9E9
| 191761 ||  || — || October 4, 2004 || Kitt Peak || Spacewatch || — || align=right | 2.0 km || 
|-id=762 bgcolor=#E9E9E9
| 191762 ||  || — || October 4, 2004 || Anderson Mesa || LONEOS || — || align=right | 1.5 km || 
|-id=763 bgcolor=#E9E9E9
| 191763 ||  || — || October 4, 2004 || Kitt Peak || Spacewatch || — || align=right | 3.0 km || 
|-id=764 bgcolor=#E9E9E9
| 191764 ||  || — || October 4, 2004 || Kitt Peak || Spacewatch || — || align=right | 1.7 km || 
|-id=765 bgcolor=#E9E9E9
| 191765 ||  || — || October 4, 2004 || Kitt Peak || Spacewatch || HOF || align=right | 3.6 km || 
|-id=766 bgcolor=#E9E9E9
| 191766 ||  || — || October 4, 2004 || Kitt Peak || Spacewatch || — || align=right | 2.6 km || 
|-id=767 bgcolor=#E9E9E9
| 191767 ||  || — || October 4, 2004 || Kitt Peak || Spacewatch || — || align=right | 1.4 km || 
|-id=768 bgcolor=#E9E9E9
| 191768 ||  || — || October 4, 2004 || Kitt Peak || Spacewatch || — || align=right | 2.5 km || 
|-id=769 bgcolor=#d6d6d6
| 191769 ||  || — || October 4, 2004 || Kitt Peak || Spacewatch || KAR || align=right | 1.5 km || 
|-id=770 bgcolor=#E9E9E9
| 191770 ||  || — || October 4, 2004 || Kitt Peak || Spacewatch || — || align=right | 2.3 km || 
|-id=771 bgcolor=#E9E9E9
| 191771 ||  || — || October 5, 2004 || Anderson Mesa || LONEOS || — || align=right | 2.3 km || 
|-id=772 bgcolor=#E9E9E9
| 191772 ||  || — || October 6, 2004 || Kitt Peak || Spacewatch || WIT || align=right | 1.7 km || 
|-id=773 bgcolor=#E9E9E9
| 191773 ||  || — || October 6, 2004 || Kitt Peak || Spacewatch || — || align=right | 1.8 km || 
|-id=774 bgcolor=#fefefe
| 191774 ||  || — || October 6, 2004 || Palomar || NEAT || — || align=right | 1.2 km || 
|-id=775 bgcolor=#E9E9E9
| 191775 ||  || — || October 12, 2004 || Moletai || Molėtai Obs. || — || align=right | 3.7 km || 
|-id=776 bgcolor=#E9E9E9
| 191776 ||  || — || October 4, 2004 || Anderson Mesa || LONEOS || — || align=right | 1.4 km || 
|-id=777 bgcolor=#E9E9E9
| 191777 ||  || — || October 5, 2004 || Kitt Peak || Spacewatch || — || align=right | 1.3 km || 
|-id=778 bgcolor=#E9E9E9
| 191778 ||  || — || October 5, 2004 || Kitt Peak || Spacewatch || XIZ || align=right | 1.7 km || 
|-id=779 bgcolor=#E9E9E9
| 191779 ||  || — || October 5, 2004 || Kitt Peak || Spacewatch || — || align=right | 1.9 km || 
|-id=780 bgcolor=#E9E9E9
| 191780 ||  || — || October 5, 2004 || Kitt Peak || Spacewatch || — || align=right | 2.4 km || 
|-id=781 bgcolor=#E9E9E9
| 191781 ||  || — || October 5, 2004 || Kitt Peak || Spacewatch || — || align=right | 1.9 km || 
|-id=782 bgcolor=#fefefe
| 191782 ||  || — || October 7, 2004 || Palomar || NEAT || NYS || align=right | 1.3 km || 
|-id=783 bgcolor=#E9E9E9
| 191783 ||  || — || October 15, 2004 || Goodricke-Pigott || Goodricke-Pigott Obs. || EUN || align=right | 1.7 km || 
|-id=784 bgcolor=#E9E9E9
| 191784 ||  || — || October 7, 2004 || Anderson Mesa || LONEOS || — || align=right | 2.0 km || 
|-id=785 bgcolor=#E9E9E9
| 191785 ||  || — || October 7, 2004 || Socorro || LINEAR || — || align=right | 1.4 km || 
|-id=786 bgcolor=#E9E9E9
| 191786 ||  || — || October 7, 2004 || Socorro || LINEAR || — || align=right | 1.8 km || 
|-id=787 bgcolor=#E9E9E9
| 191787 ||  || — || October 7, 2004 || Socorro || LINEAR || — || align=right | 3.6 km || 
|-id=788 bgcolor=#E9E9E9
| 191788 ||  || — || October 7, 2004 || Anderson Mesa || LONEOS || — || align=right | 2.1 km || 
|-id=789 bgcolor=#E9E9E9
| 191789 ||  || — || October 7, 2004 || Anderson Mesa || LONEOS || — || align=right | 4.0 km || 
|-id=790 bgcolor=#E9E9E9
| 191790 ||  || — || October 7, 2004 || Palomar || NEAT || IAN || align=right | 1.8 km || 
|-id=791 bgcolor=#E9E9E9
| 191791 ||  || — || October 7, 2004 || Palomar || NEAT || — || align=right | 3.2 km || 
|-id=792 bgcolor=#E9E9E9
| 191792 ||  || — || October 8, 2004 || Anderson Mesa || LONEOS || — || align=right | 1.3 km || 
|-id=793 bgcolor=#E9E9E9
| 191793 ||  || — || October 6, 2004 || Kitt Peak || Spacewatch || AST || align=right | 3.0 km || 
|-id=794 bgcolor=#E9E9E9
| 191794 ||  || — || October 6, 2004 || Kitt Peak || Spacewatch || — || align=right | 2.9 km || 
|-id=795 bgcolor=#E9E9E9
| 191795 ||  || — || October 7, 2004 || Socorro || LINEAR || — || align=right | 3.2 km || 
|-id=796 bgcolor=#E9E9E9
| 191796 ||  || — || October 7, 2004 || Kitt Peak || Spacewatch || — || align=right | 1.7 km || 
|-id=797 bgcolor=#E9E9E9
| 191797 ||  || — || October 7, 2004 || Kitt Peak || Spacewatch || — || align=right | 2.3 km || 
|-id=798 bgcolor=#E9E9E9
| 191798 ||  || — || October 7, 2004 || Kitt Peak || Spacewatch || — || align=right | 3.8 km || 
|-id=799 bgcolor=#E9E9E9
| 191799 ||  || — || October 7, 2004 || Kitt Peak || Spacewatch || GEF || align=right | 2.3 km || 
|-id=800 bgcolor=#E9E9E9
| 191800 ||  || — || October 8, 2004 || Kitt Peak || Spacewatch || — || align=right | 2.1 km || 
|}

191801–191900 

|-bgcolor=#E9E9E9
| 191801 ||  || — || October 5, 2004 || Kitt Peak || Spacewatch || — || align=right | 2.6 km || 
|-id=802 bgcolor=#E9E9E9
| 191802 ||  || — || October 7, 2004 || Socorro || LINEAR || — || align=right | 2.7 km || 
|-id=803 bgcolor=#E9E9E9
| 191803 ||  || — || October 7, 2004 || Socorro || LINEAR || — || align=right | 4.0 km || 
|-id=804 bgcolor=#E9E9E9
| 191804 ||  || — || October 8, 2004 || Kitt Peak || Spacewatch || KON || align=right | 3.0 km || 
|-id=805 bgcolor=#E9E9E9
| 191805 ||  || — || October 8, 2004 || Kitt Peak || Spacewatch || — || align=right | 1.5 km || 
|-id=806 bgcolor=#E9E9E9
| 191806 ||  || — || October 7, 2004 || Socorro || LINEAR || ADE || align=right | 4.9 km || 
|-id=807 bgcolor=#E9E9E9
| 191807 ||  || — || October 7, 2004 || Socorro || LINEAR || EUN || align=right | 2.0 km || 
|-id=808 bgcolor=#E9E9E9
| 191808 ||  || — || October 9, 2004 || Socorro || LINEAR || — || align=right | 2.4 km || 
|-id=809 bgcolor=#E9E9E9
| 191809 ||  || — || October 9, 2004 || Kitt Peak || Spacewatch || — || align=right | 2.4 km || 
|-id=810 bgcolor=#E9E9E9
| 191810 ||  || — || October 9, 2004 || Kitt Peak || Spacewatch || — || align=right | 4.1 km || 
|-id=811 bgcolor=#E9E9E9
| 191811 ||  || — || October 10, 2004 || Socorro || LINEAR || — || align=right | 2.8 km || 
|-id=812 bgcolor=#E9E9E9
| 191812 ||  || — || October 10, 2004 || Kitt Peak || Spacewatch || AST || align=right | 2.1 km || 
|-id=813 bgcolor=#fefefe
| 191813 ||  || — || October 8, 2004 || Kitt Peak || Spacewatch || NYS || align=right | 1.1 km || 
|-id=814 bgcolor=#E9E9E9
| 191814 ||  || — || October 10, 2004 || Socorro || LINEAR || — || align=right | 2.7 km || 
|-id=815 bgcolor=#d6d6d6
| 191815 ||  || — || October 10, 2004 || Kitt Peak || Spacewatch || — || align=right | 3.7 km || 
|-id=816 bgcolor=#E9E9E9
| 191816 ||  || — || October 10, 2004 || Kitt Peak || Spacewatch || — || align=right | 2.3 km || 
|-id=817 bgcolor=#E9E9E9
| 191817 ||  || — || October 9, 2004 || Socorro || LINEAR || — || align=right | 3.9 km || 
|-id=818 bgcolor=#E9E9E9
| 191818 ||  || — || October 10, 2004 || Socorro || LINEAR || — || align=right | 3.9 km || 
|-id=819 bgcolor=#E9E9E9
| 191819 ||  || — || October 11, 2004 || Kitt Peak || Spacewatch || — || align=right | 2.8 km || 
|-id=820 bgcolor=#E9E9E9
| 191820 ||  || — || October 14, 2004 || Palomar || NEAT || EUN || align=right | 1.6 km || 
|-id=821 bgcolor=#E9E9E9
| 191821 ||  || — || October 9, 2004 || Socorro || LINEAR || — || align=right | 2.5 km || 
|-id=822 bgcolor=#E9E9E9
| 191822 ||  || — || October 14, 2004 || Anderson Mesa || LONEOS || MAR || align=right | 1.7 km || 
|-id=823 bgcolor=#E9E9E9
| 191823 ||  || — || October 16, 2004 || Socorro || LINEAR || — || align=right | 2.5 km || 
|-id=824 bgcolor=#E9E9E9
| 191824 ||  || — || October 18, 2004 || Socorro || LINEAR || EUN || align=right | 1.8 km || 
|-id=825 bgcolor=#E9E9E9
| 191825 ||  || — || October 20, 2004 || Socorro || LINEAR || — || align=right | 2.5 km || 
|-id=826 bgcolor=#E9E9E9
| 191826 ||  || — || October 21, 2004 || Socorro || LINEAR || — || align=right | 2.2 km || 
|-id=827 bgcolor=#E9E9E9
| 191827 ||  || — || October 18, 2004 || Socorro || LINEAR || — || align=right | 4.2 km || 
|-id=828 bgcolor=#E9E9E9
| 191828 || 2004 VF || — || November 2, 2004 || Palomar || NEAT || — || align=right | 4.5 km || 
|-id=829 bgcolor=#E9E9E9
| 191829 || 2004 VR || — || November 2, 2004 || Anderson Mesa || LONEOS || — || align=right | 2.5 km || 
|-id=830 bgcolor=#E9E9E9
| 191830 ||  || — || November 2, 2004 || Anderson Mesa || LONEOS || EUN || align=right | 2.5 km || 
|-id=831 bgcolor=#E9E9E9
| 191831 ||  || — || November 3, 2004 || Kitt Peak || Spacewatch || MIS || align=right | 4.2 km || 
|-id=832 bgcolor=#E9E9E9
| 191832 ||  || — || November 3, 2004 || Kitt Peak || Spacewatch || — || align=right | 3.7 km || 
|-id=833 bgcolor=#E9E9E9
| 191833 ||  || — || November 3, 2004 || Kitt Peak || Spacewatch || — || align=right | 2.7 km || 
|-id=834 bgcolor=#E9E9E9
| 191834 ||  || — || November 3, 2004 || Anderson Mesa || LONEOS || — || align=right | 2.9 km || 
|-id=835 bgcolor=#E9E9E9
| 191835 ||  || — || November 3, 2004 || Catalina || CSS || — || align=right | 2.8 km || 
|-id=836 bgcolor=#d6d6d6
| 191836 ||  || — || November 3, 2004 || Palomar || NEAT || — || align=right | 4.6 km || 
|-id=837 bgcolor=#E9E9E9
| 191837 ||  || — || November 3, 2004 || Catalina || CSS || CLO || align=right | 3.7 km || 
|-id=838 bgcolor=#E9E9E9
| 191838 ||  || — || November 4, 2004 || Catalina || CSS || — || align=right | 4.1 km || 
|-id=839 bgcolor=#E9E9E9
| 191839 ||  || — || November 4, 2004 || Needville || Needville Obs. || — || align=right | 2.1 km || 
|-id=840 bgcolor=#E9E9E9
| 191840 ||  || — || November 3, 2004 || Kitt Peak || Spacewatch || — || align=right | 3.7 km || 
|-id=841 bgcolor=#E9E9E9
| 191841 ||  || — || November 4, 2004 || Catalina || CSS || — || align=right | 3.3 km || 
|-id=842 bgcolor=#d6d6d6
| 191842 ||  || — || November 5, 2004 || Needville || Needville Obs. || EOS || align=right | 3.0 km || 
|-id=843 bgcolor=#E9E9E9
| 191843 ||  || — || November 4, 2004 || Catalina || CSS || — || align=right | 2.5 km || 
|-id=844 bgcolor=#E9E9E9
| 191844 ||  || — || November 4, 2004 || Catalina || CSS || NEM || align=right | 3.2 km || 
|-id=845 bgcolor=#d6d6d6
| 191845 ||  || — || November 3, 2004 || Kitt Peak || Spacewatch || KOR || align=right | 2.2 km || 
|-id=846 bgcolor=#E9E9E9
| 191846 ||  || — || November 4, 2004 || Kitt Peak || Spacewatch || AST || align=right | 2.2 km || 
|-id=847 bgcolor=#E9E9E9
| 191847 ||  || — || November 4, 2004 || Kitt Peak || Spacewatch || HEN || align=right | 1.4 km || 
|-id=848 bgcolor=#E9E9E9
| 191848 ||  || — || November 4, 2004 || Kitt Peak || Spacewatch || HOF || align=right | 3.8 km || 
|-id=849 bgcolor=#E9E9E9
| 191849 ||  || — || November 4, 2004 || Kitt Peak || Spacewatch || — || align=right | 3.4 km || 
|-id=850 bgcolor=#E9E9E9
| 191850 ||  || — || November 7, 2004 || Bergisch Gladbach || W. Bickel || — || align=right | 2.4 km || 
|-id=851 bgcolor=#E9E9E9
| 191851 ||  || — || November 5, 2004 || Socorro || LINEAR || — || align=right | 2.8 km || 
|-id=852 bgcolor=#E9E9E9
| 191852 ||  || — || November 9, 2004 || Catalina || CSS || — || align=right | 2.6 km || 
|-id=853 bgcolor=#E9E9E9
| 191853 ||  || — || November 9, 2004 || Catalina || CSS || HOF || align=right | 3.4 km || 
|-id=854 bgcolor=#E9E9E9
| 191854 ||  || — || November 6, 2004 || Socorro || LINEAR || — || align=right | 4.6 km || 
|-id=855 bgcolor=#E9E9E9
| 191855 ||  || — || November 6, 2004 || Socorro || LINEAR || EUN || align=right | 2.1 km || 
|-id=856 bgcolor=#E9E9E9
| 191856 Almáriván ||  ||  || November 11, 2004 || Piszkéstető || K. Sárneczky || MRX || align=right | 1.6 km || 
|-id=857 bgcolor=#d6d6d6
| 191857 Illéserzsébet ||  ||  || November 12, 2004 || Piszkéstető || K. Sárneczky || 628 || align=right | 2.6 km || 
|-id=858 bgcolor=#E9E9E9
| 191858 ||  || — || November 18, 2004 || Campo Imperatore || CINEOS || HEN || align=right | 1.5 km || 
|-id=859 bgcolor=#E9E9E9
| 191859 ||  || — || November 19, 2004 || Socorro || LINEAR || WIT || align=right | 1.9 km || 
|-id=860 bgcolor=#E9E9E9
| 191860 ||  || — || November 18, 2004 || Socorro || LINEAR || — || align=right | 2.3 km || 
|-id=861 bgcolor=#E9E9E9
| 191861 ||  || — || December 2, 2004 || Palomar || NEAT || — || align=right | 4.5 km || 
|-id=862 bgcolor=#E9E9E9
| 191862 ||  || — || December 3, 2004 || Kitt Peak || Spacewatch || GEF || align=right | 2.3 km || 
|-id=863 bgcolor=#fefefe
| 191863 ||  || — || December 8, 2004 || Socorro || LINEAR || — || align=right | 1.1 km || 
|-id=864 bgcolor=#E9E9E9
| 191864 ||  || — || December 8, 2004 || Socorro || LINEAR || — || align=right | 2.2 km || 
|-id=865 bgcolor=#d6d6d6
| 191865 ||  || — || December 10, 2004 || Socorro || LINEAR || — || align=right | 5.2 km || 
|-id=866 bgcolor=#d6d6d6
| 191866 ||  || — || December 10, 2004 || Kitt Peak || Spacewatch || — || align=right | 3.8 km || 
|-id=867 bgcolor=#d6d6d6
| 191867 ||  || — || December 11, 2004 || Socorro || LINEAR || — || align=right | 6.1 km || 
|-id=868 bgcolor=#d6d6d6
| 191868 ||  || — || December 14, 2004 || Anderson Mesa || LONEOS || — || align=right | 7.3 km || 
|-id=869 bgcolor=#E9E9E9
| 191869 ||  || — || December 14, 2004 || Catalina || CSS || — || align=right | 2.3 km || 
|-id=870 bgcolor=#E9E9E9
| 191870 ||  || — || December 10, 2004 || Socorro || LINEAR || — || align=right | 6.4 km || 
|-id=871 bgcolor=#d6d6d6
| 191871 ||  || — || December 10, 2004 || Socorro || LINEAR || EOS || align=right | 3.9 km || 
|-id=872 bgcolor=#d6d6d6
| 191872 ||  || — || December 11, 2004 || Kitt Peak || Spacewatch || EOS || align=right | 2.6 km || 
|-id=873 bgcolor=#d6d6d6
| 191873 ||  || — || December 11, 2004 || Kitt Peak || Spacewatch || EOS || align=right | 4.3 km || 
|-id=874 bgcolor=#d6d6d6
| 191874 ||  || — || December 11, 2004 || Kitt Peak || Spacewatch || — || align=right | 3.9 km || 
|-id=875 bgcolor=#E9E9E9
| 191875 ||  || — || December 11, 2004 || Socorro || LINEAR || — || align=right | 1.6 km || 
|-id=876 bgcolor=#E9E9E9
| 191876 ||  || — || December 11, 2004 || Kitt Peak || Spacewatch || — || align=right | 2.3 km || 
|-id=877 bgcolor=#d6d6d6
| 191877 ||  || — || December 14, 2004 || Catalina || CSS || — || align=right | 3.6 km || 
|-id=878 bgcolor=#E9E9E9
| 191878 ||  || — || December 14, 2004 || Anderson Mesa || LONEOS || — || align=right | 1.9 km || 
|-id=879 bgcolor=#E9E9E9
| 191879 ||  || — || December 11, 2004 || Socorro || LINEAR || — || align=right | 4.5 km || 
|-id=880 bgcolor=#E9E9E9
| 191880 ||  || — || December 11, 2004 || Socorro || LINEAR || — || align=right | 2.2 km || 
|-id=881 bgcolor=#d6d6d6
| 191881 ||  || — || December 2, 2004 || Catalina || CSS || EOS || align=right | 3.9 km || 
|-id=882 bgcolor=#d6d6d6
| 191882 ||  || — || December 11, 2004 || Socorro || LINEAR || — || align=right | 3.6 km || 
|-id=883 bgcolor=#E9E9E9
| 191883 ||  || — || December 12, 2004 || Socorro || LINEAR || — || align=right | 2.3 km || 
|-id=884 bgcolor=#E9E9E9
| 191884 ||  || — || December 13, 2004 || Socorro || LINEAR || RAF || align=right | 1.9 km || 
|-id=885 bgcolor=#d6d6d6
| 191885 ||  || — || December 14, 2004 || Socorro || LINEAR || KOR || align=right | 2.5 km || 
|-id=886 bgcolor=#d6d6d6
| 191886 ||  || — || December 15, 2004 || Socorro || LINEAR || BRA || align=right | 2.6 km || 
|-id=887 bgcolor=#E9E9E9
| 191887 ||  || — || December 10, 2004 || Socorro || LINEAR || — || align=right | 2.4 km || 
|-id=888 bgcolor=#E9E9E9
| 191888 ||  || — || December 2, 2004 || Anderson Mesa || LONEOS || — || align=right | 3.3 km || 
|-id=889 bgcolor=#d6d6d6
| 191889 ||  || — || December 18, 2004 || Mount Lemmon || Mount Lemmon Survey || — || align=right | 3.1 km || 
|-id=890 bgcolor=#d6d6d6
| 191890 ||  || — || December 18, 2004 || Mount Lemmon || Mount Lemmon Survey || — || align=right | 7.0 km || 
|-id=891 bgcolor=#d6d6d6
| 191891 ||  || — || December 16, 2004 || Kitt Peak || Spacewatch || — || align=right | 2.8 km || 
|-id=892 bgcolor=#d6d6d6
| 191892 ||  || — || January 6, 2005 || Socorro || LINEAR || EOS || align=right | 3.4 km || 
|-id=893 bgcolor=#d6d6d6
| 191893 ||  || — || January 6, 2005 || Socorro || LINEAR || — || align=right | 6.3 km || 
|-id=894 bgcolor=#d6d6d6
| 191894 ||  || — || January 6, 2005 || Socorro || LINEAR || EOS || align=right | 3.6 km || 
|-id=895 bgcolor=#d6d6d6
| 191895 ||  || — || January 11, 2005 || Socorro || LINEAR || — || align=right | 5.3 km || 
|-id=896 bgcolor=#d6d6d6
| 191896 ||  || — || January 13, 2005 || Catalina || CSS || — || align=right | 3.1 km || 
|-id=897 bgcolor=#d6d6d6
| 191897 ||  || — || January 15, 2005 || Socorro || LINEAR || — || align=right | 7.1 km || 
|-id=898 bgcolor=#d6d6d6
| 191898 ||  || — || January 15, 2005 || Kitt Peak || Spacewatch || KOR || align=right | 2.0 km || 
|-id=899 bgcolor=#d6d6d6
| 191899 ||  || — || January 17, 2005 || Kleť || Kleť Obs. || EOS || align=right | 3.4 km || 
|-id=900 bgcolor=#E9E9E9
| 191900 ||  || — || January 16, 2005 || Socorro || LINEAR || — || align=right | 3.0 km || 
|}

191901–192000 

|-bgcolor=#d6d6d6
| 191901 ||  || — || January 16, 2005 || Socorro || LINEAR || — || align=right | 6.0 km || 
|-id=902 bgcolor=#d6d6d6
| 191902 ||  || — || January 16, 2005 || Mauna Kea || C. Veillet || — || align=right | 5.4 km || 
|-id=903 bgcolor=#d6d6d6
| 191903 ||  || — || February 2, 2005 || Kitt Peak || Spacewatch || — || align=right | 5.9 km || 
|-id=904 bgcolor=#d6d6d6
| 191904 ||  || — || February 4, 2005 || RAS || iTelescope Obs. || 7:4 || align=right | 5.5 km || 
|-id=905 bgcolor=#d6d6d6
| 191905 ||  || — || February 2, 2005 || Socorro || LINEAR || THM || align=right | 3.5 km || 
|-id=906 bgcolor=#d6d6d6
| 191906 ||  || — || March 4, 2005 || Catalina || CSS || — || align=right | 5.2 km || 
|-id=907 bgcolor=#d6d6d6
| 191907 ||  || — || March 4, 2005 || Socorro || LINEAR || — || align=right | 3.0 km || 
|-id=908 bgcolor=#fefefe
| 191908 ||  || — || March 8, 2005 || Socorro || LINEAR || NYS || align=right data-sort-value="0.91" | 910 m || 
|-id=909 bgcolor=#E9E9E9
| 191909 ||  || — || March 10, 2005 || Catalina || CSS || — || align=right | 2.6 km || 
|-id=910 bgcolor=#d6d6d6
| 191910 Elizawilliams ||  ||  || March 11, 2005 || Mount Lemmon || Mount Lemmon Survey || — || align=right | 4.8 km || 
|-id=911 bgcolor=#d6d6d6
| 191911 Nilerodgers ||  ||  || April 5, 2005 || Mount Lemmon || Mount Lemmon Survey || — || align=right | 4.6 km || 
|-id=912 bgcolor=#C2FFFF
| 191912 ||  || — || May 14, 2005 || Kitt Peak || Spacewatch || L4 || align=right | 14 km || 
|-id=913 bgcolor=#C2FFFF
| 191913 ||  || — || June 8, 2005 || Kitt Peak || Spacewatch || L4 || align=right | 12 km || 
|-id=914 bgcolor=#C2FFFF
| 191914 ||  || — || June 29, 2005 || Kitt Peak || Spacewatch || L4 || align=right | 14 km || 
|-id=915 bgcolor=#C2FFFF
| 191915 ||  || — || June 29, 2005 || Palomar || NEAT || L4 || align=right | 19 km || 
|-id=916 bgcolor=#fefefe
| 191916 ||  || — || July 28, 2005 || Reedy Creek || J. Broughton || H || align=right | 1.0 km || 
|-id=917 bgcolor=#fefefe
| 191917 ||  || — || August 29, 2005 || Socorro || LINEAR || — || align=right | 1.0 km || 
|-id=918 bgcolor=#fefefe
| 191918 ||  || — || August 29, 2005 || Anderson Mesa || LONEOS || — || align=right | 1.3 km || 
|-id=919 bgcolor=#fefefe
| 191919 ||  || — || August 27, 2005 || Anderson Mesa || LONEOS || H || align=right | 1.2 km || 
|-id=920 bgcolor=#fefefe
| 191920 ||  || — || September 23, 2005 || Kitt Peak || Spacewatch || — || align=right data-sort-value="0.92" | 920 m || 
|-id=921 bgcolor=#fefefe
| 191921 ||  || — || September 23, 2005 || Kitt Peak || Spacewatch || ERI || align=right | 3.2 km || 
|-id=922 bgcolor=#fefefe
| 191922 ||  || — || September 24, 2005 || Kitt Peak || Spacewatch || — || align=right data-sort-value="0.94" | 940 m || 
|-id=923 bgcolor=#fefefe
| 191923 ||  || — || September 24, 2005 || Kitt Peak || Spacewatch || — || align=right data-sort-value="0.85" | 850 m || 
|-id=924 bgcolor=#fefefe
| 191924 ||  || — || September 26, 2005 || Kitt Peak || Spacewatch || FLO || align=right | 1.0 km || 
|-id=925 bgcolor=#fefefe
| 191925 ||  || — || September 27, 2005 || Kitt Peak || Spacewatch || — || align=right data-sort-value="0.64" | 640 m || 
|-id=926 bgcolor=#fefefe
| 191926 ||  || — || September 24, 2005 || Kitt Peak || Spacewatch || — || align=right data-sort-value="0.63" | 630 m || 
|-id=927 bgcolor=#fefefe
| 191927 ||  || — || September 24, 2005 || Kitt Peak || Spacewatch || — || align=right data-sort-value="0.99" | 990 m || 
|-id=928 bgcolor=#fefefe
| 191928 ||  || — || September 25, 2005 || Palomar || NEAT || — || align=right | 1.0 km || 
|-id=929 bgcolor=#d6d6d6
| 191929 ||  || — || September 30, 2005 || Palomar || NEAT || — || align=right | 4.8 km || 
|-id=930 bgcolor=#fefefe
| 191930 ||  || — || September 22, 2005 || Palomar || NEAT || — || align=right data-sort-value="0.66" | 660 m || 
|-id=931 bgcolor=#fefefe
| 191931 ||  || — || October 7, 2005 || Socorro || LINEAR || — || align=right | 1.2 km || 
|-id=932 bgcolor=#fefefe
| 191932 ||  || — || October 8, 2005 || Socorro || LINEAR || — || align=right | 1.4 km || 
|-id=933 bgcolor=#fefefe
| 191933 ||  || — || October 8, 2005 || Socorro || LINEAR || FLO || align=right data-sort-value="0.91" | 910 m || 
|-id=934 bgcolor=#fefefe
| 191934 ||  || — || October 6, 2005 || Mount Lemmon || Mount Lemmon Survey || — || align=right data-sort-value="0.89" | 890 m || 
|-id=935 bgcolor=#FA8072
| 191935 ||  || — || October 24, 2005 || Palomar || NEAT || — || align=right | 1.2 km || 
|-id=936 bgcolor=#fefefe
| 191936 ||  || — || October 23, 2005 || RAS || R. Hutsebaut || — || align=right | 1.1 km || 
|-id=937 bgcolor=#fefefe
| 191937 ||  || — || October 22, 2005 || Kitt Peak || Spacewatch || NYS || align=right | 1.9 km || 
|-id=938 bgcolor=#fefefe
| 191938 ||  || — || October 22, 2005 || Kitt Peak || Spacewatch || FLO || align=right data-sort-value="0.94" | 940 m || 
|-id=939 bgcolor=#fefefe
| 191939 ||  || — || October 23, 2005 || Kitt Peak || Spacewatch || FLO || align=right data-sort-value="0.73" | 730 m || 
|-id=940 bgcolor=#fefefe
| 191940 ||  || — || October 23, 2005 || Kitt Peak || Spacewatch || — || align=right | 1.2 km || 
|-id=941 bgcolor=#fefefe
| 191941 ||  || — || October 24, 2005 || Kitt Peak || Spacewatch || — || align=right | 1.3 km || 
|-id=942 bgcolor=#fefefe
| 191942 ||  || — || October 22, 2005 || Kitt Peak || Spacewatch || FLO || align=right data-sort-value="0.91" | 910 m || 
|-id=943 bgcolor=#fefefe
| 191943 ||  || — || October 22, 2005 || Kitt Peak || Spacewatch || — || align=right | 1.1 km || 
|-id=944 bgcolor=#fefefe
| 191944 ||  || — || October 22, 2005 || Palomar || NEAT || — || align=right | 1.2 km || 
|-id=945 bgcolor=#fefefe
| 191945 ||  || — || October 23, 2005 || Catalina || CSS || — || align=right | 1.1 km || 
|-id=946 bgcolor=#fefefe
| 191946 ||  || — || October 22, 2005 || Kitt Peak || Spacewatch || — || align=right | 2.4 km || 
|-id=947 bgcolor=#fefefe
| 191947 ||  || — || October 22, 2005 || Kitt Peak || Spacewatch || — || align=right | 1.1 km || 
|-id=948 bgcolor=#fefefe
| 191948 ||  || — || October 22, 2005 || Kitt Peak || Spacewatch || NYS || align=right data-sort-value="0.84" | 840 m || 
|-id=949 bgcolor=#fefefe
| 191949 ||  || — || October 22, 2005 || Kitt Peak || Spacewatch || V || align=right | 1.1 km || 
|-id=950 bgcolor=#fefefe
| 191950 ||  || — || October 22, 2005 || Kitt Peak || Spacewatch || ERI || align=right | 3.0 km || 
|-id=951 bgcolor=#fefefe
| 191951 ||  || — || October 22, 2005 || Kitt Peak || Spacewatch || — || align=right | 1.3 km || 
|-id=952 bgcolor=#fefefe
| 191952 ||  || — || October 23, 2005 || Catalina || CSS || FLO || align=right data-sort-value="0.91" | 910 m || 
|-id=953 bgcolor=#fefefe
| 191953 ||  || — || October 24, 2005 || Kitt Peak || Spacewatch || — || align=right | 1.0 km || 
|-id=954 bgcolor=#fefefe
| 191954 ||  || — || October 26, 2005 || Kitt Peak || Spacewatch || — || align=right data-sort-value="0.94" | 940 m || 
|-id=955 bgcolor=#fefefe
| 191955 ||  || — || October 26, 2005 || Kitt Peak || Spacewatch || — || align=right | 1.1 km || 
|-id=956 bgcolor=#fefefe
| 191956 ||  || — || October 24, 2005 || Kitt Peak || Spacewatch || — || align=right | 1.1 km || 
|-id=957 bgcolor=#fefefe
| 191957 ||  || — || October 25, 2005 || Kitt Peak || Spacewatch || — || align=right | 1.0 km || 
|-id=958 bgcolor=#fefefe
| 191958 ||  || — || October 25, 2005 || Kitt Peak || Spacewatch || — || align=right | 1.0 km || 
|-id=959 bgcolor=#fefefe
| 191959 ||  || — || October 25, 2005 || Kitt Peak || Spacewatch || — || align=right data-sort-value="0.80" | 800 m || 
|-id=960 bgcolor=#fefefe
| 191960 ||  || — || October 31, 2005 || Mount Lemmon || Mount Lemmon Survey || V || align=right data-sort-value="0.83" | 830 m || 
|-id=961 bgcolor=#fefefe
| 191961 ||  || — || October 30, 2005 || Catalina || CSS || NYS || align=right data-sort-value="0.81" | 810 m || 
|-id=962 bgcolor=#fefefe
| 191962 ||  || — || October 22, 2005 || Catalina || CSS || — || align=right | 1.1 km || 
|-id=963 bgcolor=#fefefe
| 191963 ||  || — || November 6, 2005 || Socorro || LINEAR || — || align=right data-sort-value="0.97" | 970 m || 
|-id=964 bgcolor=#FA8072
| 191964 ||  || — || November 12, 2005 || Socorro || LINEAR || — || align=right | 1.6 km || 
|-id=965 bgcolor=#fefefe
| 191965 ||  || — || November 14, 2005 || Socorro || LINEAR || — || align=right | 2.2 km || 
|-id=966 bgcolor=#fefefe
| 191966 ||  || — || November 4, 2005 || Mount Lemmon || Mount Lemmon Survey || — || align=right | 1.1 km || 
|-id=967 bgcolor=#fefefe
| 191967 ||  || — || November 2, 2005 || Mount Lemmon || Mount Lemmon Survey || — || align=right | 2.4 km || 
|-id=968 bgcolor=#fefefe
| 191968 ||  || — || November 4, 2005 || Kitt Peak || Spacewatch || — || align=right | 1.2 km || 
|-id=969 bgcolor=#fefefe
| 191969 ||  || — || November 5, 2005 || Catalina || CSS || FLO || align=right data-sort-value="0.66" | 660 m || 
|-id=970 bgcolor=#fefefe
| 191970 ||  || — || November 20, 2005 || Anderson Mesa || LONEOS || FLO || align=right data-sort-value="0.74" | 740 m || 
|-id=971 bgcolor=#fefefe
| 191971 ||  || — || November 22, 2005 || Kitt Peak || Spacewatch || — || align=right | 1.1 km || 
|-id=972 bgcolor=#fefefe
| 191972 ||  || — || November 22, 2005 || Kitt Peak || Spacewatch || MAS || align=right | 1.0 km || 
|-id=973 bgcolor=#fefefe
| 191973 ||  || — || November 21, 2005 || Kitt Peak || Spacewatch || — || align=right | 1.1 km || 
|-id=974 bgcolor=#fefefe
| 191974 ||  || — || November 21, 2005 || Kitt Peak || Spacewatch || — || align=right | 1.3 km || 
|-id=975 bgcolor=#fefefe
| 191975 ||  || — || November 21, 2005 || Kitt Peak || Spacewatch || — || align=right | 1.2 km || 
|-id=976 bgcolor=#fefefe
| 191976 ||  || — || November 21, 2005 || Great Shefford || P. Birtwhistle || V || align=right data-sort-value="0.86" | 860 m || 
|-id=977 bgcolor=#fefefe
| 191977 ||  || — || November 30, 2005 || Kitt Peak || Spacewatch || FLO || align=right | 1.2 km || 
|-id=978 bgcolor=#fefefe
| 191978 ||  || — || November 21, 2005 || Catalina || CSS || FLO || align=right data-sort-value="0.94" | 940 m || 
|-id=979 bgcolor=#fefefe
| 191979 ||  || — || November 25, 2005 || Catalina || CSS || — || align=right | 1.1 km || 
|-id=980 bgcolor=#fefefe
| 191980 ||  || — || November 22, 2005 || Kitt Peak || Spacewatch || FLO || align=right data-sort-value="0.95" | 950 m || 
|-id=981 bgcolor=#fefefe
| 191981 ||  || — || November 21, 2005 || Catalina || CSS || FLO || align=right data-sort-value="0.96" | 960 m || 
|-id=982 bgcolor=#fefefe
| 191982 ||  || — || November 26, 2005 || Catalina || CSS || FLO || align=right data-sort-value="0.92" | 920 m || 
|-id=983 bgcolor=#fefefe
| 191983 ||  || — || November 26, 2005 || Kitt Peak || Spacewatch || MAS || align=right data-sort-value="0.96" | 960 m || 
|-id=984 bgcolor=#d6d6d6
| 191984 ||  || — || November 25, 2005 || Mount Lemmon || Mount Lemmon Survey || — || align=right | 4.4 km || 
|-id=985 bgcolor=#fefefe
| 191985 ||  || — || November 30, 2005 || Kitt Peak || Spacewatch || MAS || align=right | 1.0 km || 
|-id=986 bgcolor=#E9E9E9
| 191986 ||  || — || November 26, 2005 || Mount Lemmon || Mount Lemmon Survey || — || align=right | 1.3 km || 
|-id=987 bgcolor=#fefefe
| 191987 ||  || — || November 30, 2005 || Palomar || NEAT || — || align=right | 1.1 km || 
|-id=988 bgcolor=#fefefe
| 191988 ||  || — || November 29, 2005 || Kitt Peak || Spacewatch || NYS || align=right | 1.00 km || 
|-id=989 bgcolor=#fefefe
| 191989 ||  || — || November 26, 2005 || Kitt Peak || Spacewatch || MAS || align=right | 1.4 km || 
|-id=990 bgcolor=#fefefe
| 191990 ||  || — || November 21, 2005 || Kitt Peak || Spacewatch || — || align=right | 1.0 km || 
|-id=991 bgcolor=#fefefe
| 191991 ||  || — || December 2, 2005 || Socorro || LINEAR || — || align=right | 1.4 km || 
|-id=992 bgcolor=#fefefe
| 191992 ||  || — || December 1, 2005 || Socorro || LINEAR || — || align=right | 1.2 km || 
|-id=993 bgcolor=#fefefe
| 191993 ||  || — || December 1, 2005 || Kitt Peak || Spacewatch || — || align=right | 1.2 km || 
|-id=994 bgcolor=#fefefe
| 191994 ||  || — || December 2, 2005 || Socorro || LINEAR || V || align=right data-sort-value="0.97" | 970 m || 
|-id=995 bgcolor=#d6d6d6
| 191995 ||  || — || December 4, 2005 || Kitt Peak || Spacewatch || — || align=right | 5.1 km || 
|-id=996 bgcolor=#fefefe
| 191996 ||  || — || December 2, 2005 || Socorro || LINEAR || FLO || align=right | 1.0 km || 
|-id=997 bgcolor=#fefefe
| 191997 ||  || — || December 5, 2005 || Socorro || LINEAR || — || align=right | 1.3 km || 
|-id=998 bgcolor=#fefefe
| 191998 ||  || — || December 5, 2005 || Socorro || LINEAR || — || align=right | 1.4 km || 
|-id=999 bgcolor=#d6d6d6
| 191999 ||  || — || December 6, 2005 || Kitt Peak || Spacewatch || HYG || align=right | 4.6 km || 
|-id=000 bgcolor=#E9E9E9
| 192000 ||  || — || December 5, 2005 || Socorro || LINEAR || MAR || align=right | 2.5 km || 
|}

References

External links 
 Discovery Circumstances: Numbered Minor Planets (190001)–(195000) (IAU Minor Planet Center)

0191